In September 2016, the International Union for Conservation of Nature (IUCN) listed 3654 endangered plant species. Of all evaluated plant species, 17% are listed as endangered. 
The IUCN also lists 99 subspecies and 101 varieties as endangered. No subpopulations of plants have been evaluated by the IUCN.

For a species to be considered endangered by the IUCN it must meet certain quantitative criteria which are designed to classify taxa facing "a very high risk of extinction". An even higher risk is faced by critically endangered species, which meet the quantitative criteria for endangered species. Critically endangered plants are listed separately. There are 6147 plant species which are endangered or critically endangered.

Additionally 1674 plant species (7.6% of those evaluated) are listed as data deficient, meaning there is insufficient information for a full assessment of conservation status. As these species typically have small distributions and/or populations, they are intrinsically likely to be threatened, according to the IUCN. While the category of data deficient indicates that no assessment of extinction risk has been made for the taxa, the IUCN notes that it may be appropriate to give them "the same degree of attention as threatened taxa, at least until their status can be assessed".

This is a complete list of endangered plant species, subspecies and varieties evaluated by the IUCN.

Bryophytes
There are 29 bryophyte species assessed as endangered.

Hornworts
Anthoceros neesii, Nees' hornwort
Dendroceros japonicus

Mosses

Bryoxiphium madeirense
Distichophyllum carinatum
Ditrichum cornubicum, Cornish path-moss
Jaffueliobryum arsenei
Mamillariella geniculata
Merrilliobryum fabronioides
Mitrobryum koelzii
Orthodontopsis bardunovii
Orthotrichum truncato-dentatum
Renauldia lycopodioides
Sciaromiopsis sinensis
Skottsbergia paradoxa
Thamnobryum fernandesii

Liverworts

Aitchisoniella himalayensis
Andrewsianthus ferrugineus
Caudalejeunea grolleana
Cladolejeunea aberrans
Cololejeunea magnilobula
Diplocolea sikkimensis
Drepanolejeunea aculeata
Drepanolejeunea bakeri
Eopleurozia simplicissima
Leptolejeunea tridentata
Schistochila macrodonta
Sphaerocarpos drewiae
Stephensoniella brevipedunculata
Symbiezidium madagascariensis

Pteridophytes
There are 67 species and one subspecies of pteridophyte assessed as endangered.

Leptosporangiate ferns
There are 61 species and one subspecies in the class Polypodiopsida assessed as endangered.

Polypodiales
Species

Acrorumohra hasseltii
Actiniopteris kornasii
Adenophorus epigaeus
Adiantum fengianum
Adiantum sinicum
Aleuritopteris grevilleoides
Aleuritopteris squamosa
Arachniodes squamulosa
Arachniodes tsiangiana
Asplenium virens
Blechnum floresii
Blotiella hieronymi
Callipteris ulugurica
Calymmodon cucullatus
Cheilanthes deboeri
Cyclosorus boydiae, Boyd's maidenfern
Cyclosorus wailele, Waioli Valley maidenfern
Cyrtomium hemionitis
Diplazium avitaguense
Diplazium hieronymi
Diplazium pseudoporrectum
Diplazium vesiculosum
Dryopteris napoleonis, small kidney fern
Dryopteris raddeana, Radde's buckler fern
Elaphoglossum engleri
Elaphoglossum herpestes
Elaphoglossum hornei
Elaphoglossum isophyllum
Elaphoglossum spectabile
Grammitis basalis
Microgramma tuberosum
Microlepia fadenii
Neocheiropteris palmatopedata
Oleandra hainanensis
Pneumatopteris usambarensis
Polystichum bulbiferum
Pteris mkomaziensis
Pyrrosia liebuschii
Radiogrammitis cheesemanii
Saccoloma laxum
Saccoloma squamosum
Stenochlaena hainanensis
Thelypteris bermudiana, Bermuda shield fern
Thelypteris macra
Vittaria schliebenii
Zygophlebia eminens
Zygophlebia major

Subspecies
Pteris albersii subsp. albersii

Hymenophyllales

Hymenophyllum capillaceum, St Helena filmy fern
Hymenophyllum megistocarpum
Hymenophyllum nanum

Cyatheales

Alsophila esmeraldensis
Cyathea crinita
Cyathea fadenii
Cyathea heliophila
Cyathea palaciosii
Cyathea schliebenii
Plagiogyria assurgens

Salviniales

Marsilea batardae, Lusitanian water clover
Marsilea botryocarpa
Marsilea villosa
Pilularia minuta, dwarf pillwort

Isoetopsida

Isoetes boryana, Gascoyne quillwort
Isoetes capensis
Isoetes fluitans, river quillwort
Isoetes panchganiensis

Lycopodiopsida
Huperzia hastata
Huperzia loxensis

Gymnosperms
There are 163 species, seven subspecies, and 29 varieties of gymnosperm assessed as endangered.

Ginkgos
Ginkgo biloba, ginkgo

Cycads
Species

Ceratozamia alvarezii
Ceratozamia becerrae
Ceratozamia hildae, bamboo cycad
Ceratozamia latifolia
Ceratozamia matudae
Ceratozamia mirandae
Ceratozamia mixeorum
Ceratozamia morettii
Ceratozamia norstogii
Ceratozamia robusta
Ceratozamia sabatoi
Ceratozamia whitelockiana
Cycas beddomei
Cycas candida, white seed sago
Cycas changjiangensis
Cycas circinalis
Cycas elephantipes
Cycas elongata
Cycas hainanensis
Cycas hoabinhensis
Cycas javana
Cycas lindstromii
Cycas micronesica
Cycas multipinnata
Cycas platyphylla
Cycas riuminiana, Arayat pitogo
Cycas taitungensis
Cycas taiwaniana
Dioon califanoi
Dioon caputoi
Dioon holmgrenii
Dioon rzedowskii
Dioon sonorense
Dioon spinulosum
Encephalartos arenarius, Alexandria cycad
Encephalartos chimanimaniensis, Chimanimani cycad
Encephalartos concinnus, Runde cycad
Encephalartos delucanus
Encephalartos eugene-maraisii, Waterberg cycad
Encephalartos horridus, Eastern Cape blue cycad
Encephalartos kisambo, Voi cycad
Encephalartos lebomboensis, Lebombo cycad
Encephalartos macrostrobilus
Encephalartos umbeluziensis, Umbeluzi cycad
Macrozamia cranei
Macrozamia elegans
Macrozamia flexuosa
Macrozamia lomandroides
Macrozamia pauli-guilielmi
Macrozamia plurinervia
Macrozamia spiralis
Macrozamia viridis
Zamia cremnophila
Zamia dressleri
Zamia elegantissima
Zamia fischeri
Zamia furfuracea, cardboard palm
Zamia ipetiensis
Zamia katzeriana
Zamia lacandona
Zamia lucayana
Zamia melanorrhachis
Zamia portoricensis
Zamia skinneri
Zamia variegata

Subspecies
Encephalartos barteri subsp. allochrous

Conifers
Species

Abies fanjingshanensis
Abies fraseri, Fraser fir
Abies guatemalensis, Guatemalan fir
Abies hickelii, Hickel's fir
Abies koreana, Korean fir
Abies pinsapo, Spanish fir
Abies ziyuanensis, Ziyuan fir
Afrocarpus usambarensis
Agathis borneensis
Agathis kinabaluensis
Agathis macrophylla, Fijian kauri pine
Agathis orbicula
Agathis ovata, scrub kauri
Amentotaxus assamica, Assam catkin yew
Amentotaxus hatuyenensis
Araucaria araucana, monkey puzzle
Araucaria humboldtensis
Araucaria luxurians
Araucaria muelleri
Araucaria rulei
Araucaria scopulorum
Athrotaxis laxifolia
Callitris sulcata
Calocedrus formosana, Taiwan incense-cedar
Calocedrus rupestris
Cedrus atlantica, Atlas cedar
Cephalotaxus hainanensis, Hainan plum yew
Cephalotaxus lanceolata, Gongshan plum yew
Chamaecyparis formosensis, Taiwan cypress
Cunninghamia konishii
Cupressus dupreziana, Saharan cypress
Cupressus goveniana, Gowen cypress
Cupressus guadalupensis, Guadalupe cypress
Dacrydium comosum
Dacrydium nausoriense
Dacrydium pectinatum
Falcatifolium angustum
Fitzroya cupressoides, Patagonian cypress
Juniperus cedrus, Canary Islands juniper
Juniperus comitana
Juniperus gamboana
Juniperus gracilior
Juniperus jaliscana
Juniperus saltillensis
Juniperus standleyi
Larix mastersiana, Masters' larch
Libocedrus yateensis
Metasequoia glyptostroboides, dawn redwood
Nageia maxima
Neocallitropsis pancheri
Picea aurantiaca, orange spruce
Picea chihuahuana, Chihuahua spruce
Picea martinezii, Martinez's spruce
Picea maximowiczii, Maximowicz's spruce
Picea omorika, Serbian spruce
Picea retroflexa, Tapao Shan spruce
Pinus albicaulis, whitebark pine
Pinus amamiana, Amami pine
Pinus culminicola, Potosi pinyon pine
Pinus maximartinezii, Martinez pinyon
Pinus nelsonii, Nelson pinyon pine
Pinus occidentalis, Hispaniolan pine
Pinus palustris, longleaf pine
Pinus radiata, Monterey pine
Pinus wangii
Podocarpus buchii
Podocarpus capuronii
Podocarpus confertus
Podocarpus costalis
Podocarpus globulus
Podocarpus henkelii, Henkel's yellowwood
Podocarpus hispaniolensis
Podocarpus humbertii
Podocarpus laubenfelsii
Podocarpus longefoliolatus
Podocarpus macrocarpus
Podocarpus nakaii
Podocarpus pendulifolius
Podocarpus polyspermus
Podocarpus purdieanus, St. Ann yacca
Podocarpus rostratus
Podocarpus sellowii
Podocarpus sprucei
Podocarpus transiens
Prumnopitys standleyi
Pseudotsuga japonica, Japanese Douglas-fir
Retrophyllum minus
Sequoia sempervirens, coast redwood
Sequoiadendron giganteum, giant sequoia
Taxus chinensis, Chinese yew
Taxus contorta, West Himalayan yew
Taxus globosa, Mesoamerican yew
Taxus wallichiana, East Himalayan yew
Thuja sutchuenensis
Torreya jackii, Jack's nutmeg tree
Xanthocyparis vietnamensis, golden Vietnamese cypress

Subspecies

Abies nordmanniana subsp. equi-trojani, Kazdagi fir
Picea engelmannii subsp. mexicana, Mexican spruce
Pinus cembroides subsp. orizabensis, Orizaba pinyon
Pinus mugo subsp. rotundata
Pinus nigra subsp. dalmatica
Pinus pinaster subsp. renoui

Varieties

Abies guatemalensis var. guatemalensis
Abies hickelii var. hickelii
Abies hickelii var. oaxacana
Abies pinsapo var. marocana, Moroccan fir
Abies pinsapo var. pinsapo
Cephalotaxus harringtonii var. wilsoniana, Taiwan plum yew
Cupressus arizonica var. nevadensis
Cupressus goveniana var. goveniana
Cupressus guadalupensis var. forbesii
Cupressus guadalupensis var. guadalupensis
Juniperus deppeana var. zacatecensis
Juniperus gracilior var. gracilior
Juniperus gracilior var. urbaniana
Keteleeria davidiana var. formosana
Larix decidua var. polonica
Picea alcoquiana var. acicularis
Picea alcoquiana var. reflexa
Picea asperata var. notabilis
Picea likiangensis var. hirtella
Picea maximowiczii var. maximowiczii
Pinus armandii var. mastersiana
Pinus caribaea var. caribaea
Pinus greggii var. australis
Pinus radiata var. radiata, Cambria pine
Pinus strobus var. chiapensis
Podocarpus madagascariensis var. procerus
Podocarpus sellowii var. sellowii
Torreya fargesii var. fargesii
Torreya fargesii var. yunnanensis

Gnetopsida
Gnetum oxycarpum

Dicotyledons
There are 2770 species, 81 subspecies, and 70 varieties of dicotyledon assessed as endangered.

Piperales
There are 51 species in the order Piperales assessed as endangered.

Piperaceae

Peperomia arenillasensis
Peperomia clivigaudens
Peperomia disjunctiflora
Peperomia espinosae
Peperomia fagerlindii
Peperomia kamerunana
Peperomia lehmannii
Peperomia leucanthera
Peperomia pachystachya
Peperomia paradoxa
Peperomia persuculenta
Peperomia rubropunctulata
Peperomia salangonis
Peperomia septentrionalis, wild Bermuda pepper
Peperomia subdiscoidea
Peperomia tuberculata
Peperomia udimontana
Peperomia valladolidana
Peperomia wibomii
Piper achupallasense
Piper azuaiense
Piper baezense
Piper barberi
Piper begoniiforme
Piper brachipilum
Piper brachystylum
Piper campii
Piper chimborazoense
Piper coeloneurum
Piper cutucuense
Piper densiciliatum
Piper diffundum
Piper disparipilum
Piper dodsonii
Piper eriocladum
Piper fallenii
Piper huigranum
Piper longicaudatum
Piper mendezense
Piper nanegalense
Piper perstrigosum
Piper prietoi
Piper productispicum
Piper puyoense
Piper regale
Piper saloyanum
Piper skutchii
Piper valladolidense
Piper zarumanum

Chloranthaceae
Hedyosmum burgerianum
Hedyosmum correanum

Campanulales

Campanulaceae
Species

Azorina vidalii
Burmeistera anderssonii
Burmeistera cuyujensis
Burmeistera domingensis
Burmeistera holm-nielsenii
Burmeistera huacamayensis
Burmeistera ignimontis
Burmeistera oyacachensis
Burmeistera resupinata
Campanula autraniana, Autran's campanula
Campanula choruhensis, Choruhian bellflower
Campanula kachethica, Kakhetian bellflower
Campanula massalskyi, Massalsky's campanula
Campanula songutica, Songutian campanula
Centropogon aequatorialis
Centropogon azuayensis
Centropogon balslevii
Centropogon chiltasonensis
Centropogon chontalensis
Centropogon comosus
Centropogon erythraeus
Centropogon hartwegii
Centropogon heteropilis
Centropogon hirtiflorus
Centropogon medusa
Centropogon occultus
Centropogon parviflorus
Centropogon phoeniceus
Centropogon rimbachii
Centropogon rubiginosus
Centropogon steinii
Centropogon steyermarkii
Centropogon ursinus
Centropogon zamorensis
Clermontia calophylla, lava clermontia
Clermontia drepanomorpha, Kohala clermontia
Clermontia lindseyana
Clermontia samuelii
Clermontia tuberculata, Haleakala clermontia
Clermontia waimeae
Cyanea copelandii
Cyanea koolauensis
Hanabusaya asiatica
Jasione lusitanica
Jasione mansanetiana
Lobelia collina
Lobelia subpubera
Lysipomia aretioides
Lysipomia bilineata
Lysipomia crassomarginata
Lysipomia cuspidata
Lysipomia cylindrocarpa
Lysipomia laricina
Lysipomia lehmannii
Lysipomia rhizomata
Lysipomia sparrei
Lysipomia speciosa
Lysipomia tubulosa
Lysipomia vitreola
Musschia wollastonii
Siphocampylus asplundii
Siphocampylus ecuadoriensis
Siphocampylus fruticosus
Siphocampylus furax
Siphocampylus lucidus
Siphocampylus rostratus
Siphocampylus rupestris
Wahlenbergia ericoidella

Subspecies

Clermontia arborescens subsp. arborescens
Cyanea copelandii subsp. haleakalaensis
Cyanea macrostegia subsp. gibsonii
Wahlenbergia pulchella subsp. laurentii
Wahlenbergia pulchella subsp. michelii

Aristolochiales

Aristolochia delavayi
Aristolochia scytophylla
Aristolochia tuberosa
Asarum celsum
Asarum hatsushimae
Asarum lutchuense
Asarum nazeanum
Asarum trinacriforme
Saruma henryi

Theales
There are 174 species, 12 subspecies, and two varieties in Theales assessed as endangered.

Dipterocarpaceae
Species

Anisoptera costata
Anisoptera grossivenia
Anisoptera laevis
Anisoptera marginata
Cotylelobium burckii
Cotylelobium melanoxylon
Dipterocarpus alatus
Dipterocarpus costatus
Dipterocarpus crinitus
Dipterocarpus indicus
Dipterocarpus sublamellatus
Dipterocarpus zeylanicus
Dryobalanops beccarii
Dryobalanops lanceolata
Hopea altocollina
Hopea auriculata
Hopea celebica
Hopea centipeda
Hopea cordifolia
Hopea dasyrrhachis
Hopea discolor
Hopea ferrea
Hopea fluvialis
Hopea glabra
Hopea gregaria
Hopea megacarpa
Hopea mesuoides
Hopea parviflora
Hopea pedicellata
Hopea pierrei
Hopea ponga
Hopea racophloea
Hopea recopei
Hopea utilis
Hopea vacciniifolia
Monotes lutambensis
Parashorea chinensis
Parashorea densiflora
Parashorea globosa
Shorea affinis
Shorea agamii
Shorea albida
Shorea andulensis
Shorea argentifolia
Shorea balanocarpoides
Shorea bentongensis
Shorea biawak
Shorea bracteolata
Shorea brunnescens
Shorea ciliata
Shorea dasyphylla
Shorea disticha
Shorea domatiosa
Shorea dyeri
Shorea faguetiana
Shorea falcifera
Shorea glauca
Shorea gratissima
Shorea henryana
Shorea leprosula, meranti
Shorea maxima
Shorea maxwelliana
Shorea obscura
Shorea ovata
Shorea pauciflora
Shorea platyclados
Shorea quadrinervis
Shorea roxburghii
Shorea splendida
Shorea stenoptera
Shorea submontana
Shorea teysmanniana
Shorea tumbuggaia
Shorea worthingtonii
Stemonoporus acuminatus
Stemonoporus angustisepalus
Stemonoporus bullatus
Stemonoporus cordifolius
Stemonoporus gardneri
Stemonoporus kanneliyensis
Stemonoporus laevifolius
Stemonoporus oblongifolius
Stemonoporus reticulatus
Stemonoporus revolutus
Stemonoporus rigidus
Stemonoporus scaphifolius
Upuna borneensis
Vateria copallifera
Vatica badiifolia
Vatica bantamensis
Vatica brunigii
Vatica cinerea
Vatica lowii
Vatica mangachapoi
Vatica maritima
Vatica nitens
Vatica obscura
Vatica pallida
Vatica pauciflora
Vatica pedicellata
Vatica perakensis
Vatica stapfiana

Subspecies

Dipterocarpus caudatus subsp. penangianus
Dryobalanops oblongifolia subsp. oblongifolia
Dryobalanops oblongifolia subsp. occidentalis
Shorea agamii subsp. agamii
Shorea macroptera subsp. baillonii
Shorea macroptera subsp. macropterifolia
Shorea ovalis subsp. ovalis
Shorea parvifolia subsp. parvifolia
Shorea parvifolia subsp. velutina
Vatica oblongifolia subsp. multinervosa
Vatica odorata subsp. mindanensis

Theaceae
Species

Adinandra griffithii
Camellia amplexifolia
Camellia candida
Camellia chrysanthoides
Camellia elongata
Camellia hongkongensis, Hong Kong camellia
Camellia huana
Camellia longipedicellata
Camellia longzhouensis
Camellia micrantha
Camellia parviflora
Camellia paucipunctata
Camellia pingguoensis
Camellia pubifurfuracea
Camellia szechuanensis
Camellia tenii
Camellia tonkinensis
Camellia xanthochroma
Eurya rengechiensis
Freziera dudleyi
Freziera revoluta
Freziera smithiana
Freziera spathulifolia
Gordonia villosa
Ternstroemia calycina
Ternstroemia cleistogama

Varieties
Cleyera japonica var. grandiflora

Actinidiaceae

Actinidia stellatopilosa
Saurauia aguaricana
Saurauia mexiae
Saurauia seibertii
Saurauia serrata
Saurauia striata
Saurauia tambensis

Guttiferae
Species

Calophyllum insularum
Calophyllum morobense
Calophyllum nubicola
Calophyllum trapezifolium
Calophyllum waliense
Clusia plurivalvis
Garcinia bifasciculata
Garcinia imberti
Garcinia kingii
Garcinia linii
Garcinia paucinervis
Garcinia thwaitesii
Garcinia zeylanica
Hypericum asplundii
Hypericum prietoi
Hypericum theodori, Theodor's Saint John's wort
Mammea immansueta
Rheedia aristata
Vismia jefensis
Vismia pauciflora

Subspecies
Hypericum socotranum subsp. socotranum
Varieties
Clusia havetioides var. pauciflora

Other Theales species

Anthodiscus montanus
Asteropeia labatii
Asteropeia matrambody
Asteropeia micraster
Asteropeia rhopaloides
Brazzeia longipedicellata
Caryocar amygdaliforme
Caryocar coriaceum
Dialyceras discolor
Marcgravia grandifolia
Marcgraviastrum sodiroi
Ouratea insulae
Quiina schippii
Rhaptopetalum depressum
Rhaptopetalum sessilifolium
Rhopalocarpus mollis
Rhopalocarpus randrianaivoi
Testulea gabonensis

Linales
Species

Erythroxylum ruizii
Erythroxylum socotranum
Humiriastrum melanocarpum
Vantanea depleta
Vantanea magdalenensis

Varieties
Allantospermum borneense var. rostratrum

Malvales
There are 67 species, four subspecies, and one variety in the order Malvales assessed as endangered.

Malvaceae
Species

Acropogon calcicolus
Acropogon veillonii
Alcea grossheimii, Grossheim's alcea
Atkinsia cubensis
Firmiana major
Hampea montebellensis
Hampea sphaerocarpa
Hibiscus noli-tangere
Hibiscus socotranus
Julostylis polyandra
Lebronnecia kokioides
Wercklea cocleana
Wercklea grandiflora
Wissadula diffusa
Wissadula divergens

Subspecies

Hibiscus arnottianus subsp. immaculatus, white Molokai hibiscus
Hibiscus brackenridgei subsp. brackenridgei
Hibiscus brackenridgei subsp. mokuleianus
Hibiscus kokio subsp. saintjohnianus, Saint John's rosemallow

Sterculiaceae
Species

Byttneria asplundii
Byttneria flexuosa
Byttneria loxensis
Byttneria obtusata
Cola attiensis
Cola boxiana
Cola lourougnonis
Cola lukei
Cola octoloboides
Cola philipi-jonesii
Cola porphyrantha
Heritiera fomes
Heritiera globosa
Heritiera percoriacea
Herrania balaensis
Herrania umbratica
Hildegardia ankaranensis
Hildegardia gillettii
Nesogordonia monantha
Paramelhania decaryana

Varieties
Mansonia altissima var. altissima

Bombacaceae

Adansonia grandidieri
Adansonia perrieri
Adansonia suarezensis
Camptostemon philippinense
Gyranthera darienensis
Matisia alata
Matisia coloradorum
Matisia exalata
Matisia grandifolia
Matisia palenquiana
Quararibea aurantiocalyx
Quararibea dolichopoda
Quararibea gomeziana
Quararibea pendula
Quararibea platyphylla
Quararibea sanblasensis

Sarcolaenaceae

Leptolaena abrahamii
Leptolaena multiflora
Leptolaena pauciflora
Leptolaena villosa
Sarcolaena delphinensis
Xerochlamys elliptica

Tiliaceae

Brownlowia velutina
Burretiodendron tonkinense
Carpodiptera ophiticola
Craigia yunnanensis
Diplodiscus hookerianus
Grewia limae
Neosprucea sararensis
Schoutenia cornerii

Elaeocarpaceae

Elaeocarpus blascoi
Elaeocarpus ceylanicus
Elaeocarpus coriaceus

Geraniales

Dirachma somalensis
Erodium paularense
Geranium exallum
Impatiens andringitrensis
Impatiens anovensis
Impatiens cribbii
Impatiens etindensis
Impatiens frithii
Impatiens gongolana
Impatiens letouzeyi
Impatiens obesa
Impatiens omeiana
Impatiens pritzelii
Impatiens wilsoni
Oxalis chachahuensis
Oxalis ecuadorensis
Oxalis pennelliana
Tropaeolum carchense

Lecythidales
Species

Cariniana ianeirensis
Cariniana pauciramosa
Couratari atrovinosa
Couratari pyramidata
Eschweilera jacquelyniae
Eschweilera rabeliana
Foetidia delphinensis
Foetidia dracaenoides
Foetidia pterocarpa
Foetidia sambiranensis
Grias longirachis
Gustavia dodsonii
Gustavia excelsa
Gustavia gracillima
Gustavia longepetiolata
Gustavia monocaulis
Gustavia petiolata
Gustavia serrata
Lecythis prancei

Subspecies
Eschweilera piresii subsp. piresii

Polygalales
Species

Acridocarpus congestus
Acridocarpus monodii
Acridocarpus pauciglandulosus
Acridocarpus scheffleri
Korupodendron songweanum
Malpighia cauliflora
Mascagnia haenkeana
Monnina haughtii
Monnina sodiroana
Polygala urartu, Urartuan milkwort
Pterandra isthmica
Stigmaphyllon ecuadorense
Stigmaphyllon eggersii

Subspecies
Bunchosia diphylla subsp. brevisurcularis
Varieties
Acridocarpus alopecurus var. machaeropterus

Santalales

Agelanthus atrocoronatus
Agelanthus igneus
Agelanthus microphyllus
Agelanthus uhehensis
Agelanthus validus
Anacolosa densiflora
Dendrophthora capillaris
Dendrophthora dalstroemii
Dendrophthora fastigiata
Dendrophthora ovata
Dendrophthora thomasii
Dendrophthora variabilis
Englerina longiflora
Englerina macilenta
Englerina ramulosa
Exocarpos gaudichaudii, Gaudichaud's exocarpus
Heisteria cyathiformis
Okoubaka aubrevillei, death tree
Oncella schliebeniana
Phoradendron madisonii
Phoradendron wiensii
Santalum freycinetianum, Lanai sandalwood
Santalum macgregorii
Schoepfia arenaria
Soyauxia talbotii
Struthanthus lojae

Proteales

Alloxylon brachycarpum
Beauprea congesta
Bleasdalea papuana
Helicia insularis
Helicia shweliensis
Heliciopsis lanceolata
Leucadendron discolor
Roupala brachybotrys
Stenocarpus heterophyllus

Dipsacales
Species

Centranthus trinervis
Lonicera paradoxa
Scabiosa adzharica, Adjarian scabious
Succisella andreae-molinae
Tetradoxa omeiensis
Valeriana secunda

Subspecies
Sambucus nigra subsp. palmensis
Varieties
Viburnum villosum var. subdentatum

Plumbaginales

Armeria pseudarmeria
Armeria soleirolii
Limonium bahamense, heather
Limonium fruticans
Limonium legrandii
Limonium poimenum
Limonium preauxii
Limonium strictissimum

Rubiales
Species

Afrocanthium rondoense
Arachnothryx fosbergii
Asperula virgata, rod-shaped woodruff
Bikkia kaalaensis
Bikkia lenormandii
Blepharidium guatemalense
Bobea timonioides
Byrsophyllum tetrandrum
Canthium sechellense
Chassalia eurybotrya
Chassalia sp.
Cinchona mutisii
Coffea bakossii
Coffea myrtifolia
Craterispermum microdon
Cuviera schliebenii
Dichilanthe zeylanica
Didymosalpinx callianthus
Elaeagia uxpanapensis
Gaertnera spicata
Gaertnera ternifolia
Gaillonia thymoides
Galium ecuadoricum
Galium fosbergii
Galium viridiflorum
Gardenia grievei
Glionnetia sericea
Guettardella sp. 'durisylvatica'
Hoffmannia ecuatoriana
Hymenodictyon tsingy
Ixora calycina
Ixora lawsoni
Ixora saulierei
Joosia aequatoria
Joosia standleyana
Kadua cookiana
Lasianthus tomentosus
Lasianthus varians
Leptactina papyrophloea
Manettia angamarcensis
Manettia skutchii
Manettia teresitae
Mitrostigma barteri
Nostolachma crassifolia
Oxyanthus biflorus
Oxyanthus sp. A
Palicourea fuchsioides
Palicourea heilbornii
Pavetta brachycalyx
Pavetta lindina
Pavetta muiriana
Pentagonia involucrata
Phialanthus jamaicensis
Phialanthus revolutus
Pseudomussaenda mozambicensis
Psychotria angustata, pink wild coffee
Psychotria beddomei
Psychotria clarendonensis
Psychotria clusioides
Psychotria densinervia
Psychotria gardneri
Psychotria glandulifera
Psychotria globicephala
Psychotria grandiflora, large-flowered balsamo
Psychotria hobdyi, Hobdy's wild-coffee
Psychotria longipetiolata
Psychotria macrocarpa
Psychotria madida
Psychotria plurivenia
Psychotria rimbachii
Psychotria siphonophora
Psychotria sordida
Psydrax bridsoniana
Psydrax ficiformis
Psydrax pergracilis
Randia carlosiana
Rondeletia amplexicaulis
Rondeletia brachyphylla
Rondeletia clarendonensis
Rondeletia dolphinensis
Rothmannia ebamutensis
Rustia bilsana
Rytigynia longipedicellata
Sabicea xanthotricha
Saprosma scabrida
Scolosanthus howardii
Scolosanthus roulstonii
Sericanthe toupetou
Spermacoce capillaris
Stenostomum aromaticum
Stilpnophyllum grandifolium
Tapiphyllum schliebenii
Tarenna agumbensis
Tarenna monosperma
Tarenna pembensis
Tricalysia lejolyana

Subspecies
Leptactina delagoensis subsp. bussei
Oxyanthus pyriformis subsp. longitubus
Varieties
Ixora oligantha var. opuloides
Psychotria nilgiriensis var. astephana

Violales
There are 68 species, one subspecies, and one variety in Violales assessed as endangered.

Flacourtiaceae
Species

Banara ibaguensis
Banara regia
Banara riparia
Banara wilsonii
Casearia atlantica
Casearia kaalaensis
Casearia mexiae
Chiangiodendron mexicanum
Homalium betulifolium
Homalium buxifolium
Homalium hypolasium
Homalium jainii
Homalium juxtapositum
Homalium mathieuanum
Homalium polystachyum
Homalium rubrocostatum
Homalium spathulatum
Hydnocarpus scortechinii
Lasiochlamys hurlimannii
Lunania dodecandra
Lunania elongata
Mayna pubescens
Mayna suaveolens
Xylosma grossecrenata
Xylosma inaequinervia
Xylosma latifolia syn. Flacourtia latifolia
Xylosma obovata

Subspecies
Xylosma suaveolens subsp. haroldii

Violaceae

Isodendrion longifolium
Rinorea antioquiensis
Rinorea bicornuta
Rinorea cordata
Rinorea deflexa
Rinorea fausteana
Rinorea haughtii
Rinorea hymenosepala
Rinorea laurifolia
Rinorea villosiflora
Viola cuicochensis
Viola libanotica, Lebanon violet
Viola oahuensis

Passifloraceae
Species

Adenia dolichosiphon
Adenia kigogoensis
Adenia racemosa
Adenia schliebenii
Passiflora andina
Passiflora anfracta
Passiflora brachyantha
Passiflora discophora
Passiflora harlingii
Passiflora linda
Passiflora loxensis
Passiflora luzmarina
Passiflora montana
Passiflora subpurpurea
Passiflora zamorana

Varieties
Paropsia grewioides var. orientalis

Other Violales species

Ancistrocladus korupensis
Cistus chinamadensis
Cochlospermum tetraporum
Helianthemum dagestanicum, Dagestanian sun rose
Helianthemum guerrae
Nasa aequatoriana
Nasa connectans
Nasa peltata
Nasa profundilobata
Tuberaria major
Turnera hindsiana
Vasconcellea horovitziana
Vasconcellea omnilingua

Euphorbiales
There are 93 species, four subspecies, and 15 varieties in Euphorbiales assessed as endangered.

Buxaceae
Buxus nyasica
Styloceras kunthianum

Euphorbiaceae
Species

Acalypha schimpffii
Acidocroton gentryi
Aporosa bourdillonii
Argythamnia argentea
Baloghia pininsularis
Bernardia trelawniensis
Bocquillonia arborea
Bocquillonia castaneifolia
Bocquillonia longipes
Cleidiocarpon laurinum
Cleistanthus travancorensis
Cnidoscolus matosii
Cnidoscolus rangel
Croton alienus
Croton cordatulus
Croton eggersii
Croton fraseri
Croton lehmannii
Croton pavonis
Croton rivinifolius
Dimorphocalyx beddomei
Drypetes andamanica
Drypetes magnistipula
Drypetes porteri
Drypetes travancoria
Euphorbia abdelkuri
Euphorbia angustiflora
Euphorbia ankaranae
Euphorbia ankarensis
Euphorbia aristata, bearded spurge
Euphorbia bisglobosa
Euphorbia brachyphylla
Euphorbia croizatii
Euphorbia cylindrifolia
Euphorbia decaryi
Euphorbia decorsei
Euphorbia didiereoides
Euphorbia discrepans
Euphorbia duranii
Euphorbia elliotii
Euphorbia epiphylloides
Euphorbia erythroxyloides
Euphorbia greenwayi
Euphorbia grossheimii, Grossheim's spurge
Euphorbia guillauminiana
Euphorbia haeleeleana
Euphorbia hamaderoensis
Euphorbia hedyotoides
Euphorbia herman-schwartzii
Euphorbia horombensis
Euphorbia humbertii
Euphorbia imerina
Euphorbia kamponii
Euphorbia kuwaleana
Euphorbia mananarensis
Euphorbia mandravioky
Euphorbia mangokyensis
Euphorbia mangorensis
Euphorbia neohumbertii
Euphorbia pseudonudicaule
Euphorbia quartziticola
Euphorbia santapaui
Euphorbia tetracanthoides
Euphorbia wakefieldii
Flueggea anatolica
Garcia nutans
Glochidion comitum
Glochidion pauciflorum
Glochidion raivavense
Glochidion sisparense
Glochidion tomentosum
Jatropha nudicaulis
Koilodepas calycinum
Lingelsheimia sylvestris
Macaranga mauritiana
Phyllanthus ampandrandavae
Phyllanthus ankaratrae
Phyllanthus axillaris
Phyllanthus caymanensis
Phyllanthus conjugatus
Phyllanthus gentryi
Phyllanthus haughtii
Phyllanthus isomonensis
Phyllanthus marojejiensis
Phyllanthus sponiaefolius
Phyllanthus unifoliatus
Sebastiania fasciculata
Sebastiania spicata
Tetrorchidium brevifolium
Thecacoris annobonae syn. Thecacoris trichogyne
Uapaca niangadoumae

Subspecies

Euphorbia cylindrifolia subsp. cylindrifolia
Euphorbia skottsbergii subsp. skottsbergii
Necepsia castaneifolia subsp. chirindica
Necepsia castaneifolia subsp. kimbozensis

Varieties

Antidesma platyphyllum var. hillebrandii
Drypetes usambarica var. stylosa
Euphorbia celastroides var. kaenana
Euphorbia decaryi var. decaryi
Euphorbia duranii var. duranii
Euphorbia greenwayi var. breviaculeata
Euphorbia mahafalensis var. mahafalensis
Euphorbia milii var. bevilanensis
Euphorbia milii var. vulcanii
Euphorbia perrieri var. elongata
Euphorbia perrieri var. perrieri
Euphorbia primulifolia var. begardii
Glochidion ellipticum var. ralphii
Jatropha hildebrandtii var. hildebrandtii
Phyllanthus aeneus var. nepouiensis

Laurales
There are 67 species, two subspecies, and two varieties in the order Laurales assessed as endangered.

Gomortegaceae
Gomortega keule

Monimiaceae

Mollinedia longicuspidata
Mollinedia stenophylla
Siparuna campii
Siparuna eggersii
Siparuna palenquensis

Hernandiaceae
Species
Hernandia lychnifera
Hernandia mascarenensis
Subspecies
Hernandia moerenhoutiana subsp. elliptica

Lauraceae
Species

Actinodaphne bourneae
Actinodaphne salicina
Aiouea angulata
Aiouea obscura
Alseodaphne rugosa
Aniba pilosa
Aniba rosodora
Aspidostemon antongilensis
Aspidostemon apiculatus
Aspidostemon fungiformis
Aspidostemon humbertianus
Aspidostemon lucens
Aspidostemon microphyllus
Aspidostemon percoriaceus
Beilschmiedia rugosa
Beilschmiedia zeylanica
Caryodaphnopsis cogolloi
Cinnamomum balansae
Cinnamomum brevipedunculatum
Cinnamomum chemungianum
Cinnamomum citriodorum
Cinnamomum filipedicellatum
Cinnamomum kanahirae
Cinnamomum mairei
Cinnamomum wightii
Cryptocarya anamallayana
Cryptocarya bitriplinervia
Cryptocarya membranacea
Cryptocarya palawanensis
Dahlgrenodendron natalense
Damburneya bicolor
Damburneya leucocome
Damburneya longipetiolata
Litsea beddomei
Litsea dilleniifolia
Litsea glaberrima
Litsea imbricata
Litsea leiantha
Litsea nemoralis
Litsea nigrescens
Litsea travancorica
Nectandra bicolor
Nectandra cerifolia
Nectandra fragrans
Nectandra herrerae
Nectandra krugii
Nectandra psammophila
Nectandra utilis
Nectandra weddellii
Neolitsea daibuensis
Ocotea basicordatifolia
Ocotea jorge-escobarii
Ocotea staminoides
Persea conferta
Phoebe nanmu
Phyllostemonodaphne geminiflora
Pleurothyrium giganthum
Pleurothyrium obovatum
Urbanodendron bahiense
Urbanodendron macrophyllum

Subspecies
Apollonias barbujana subsp. ceballosi
Varieties
Actinodaphne campanulata var. obtusa
Litsea pierrei var. szemois

Cucurbitales

Begoniaceae

Begonia aeranthos
Begonia bonus-henricus
Begonia furfuracea
Begonia hainanensis
Begonia harlingii
Begonia hitchcockii
Begonia ludwigii
Begonia pelargoniiflora
Begonia peltatifolia
Begonia pseudoviola
Begonia rubromarginata
Begonia samhaensis
Begonia serotina
Begonia triramosa
Begonia tropaeolifolia
Begonia valvata

Ebenales
There are 96 species, one subspecies, and two varieties in Ebenales assessed as endangered.

Symplocaceae
Species

Symplocos anamallayana
Symplocos badia
Symplocos barberi
Symplocos blancae
Symplocos breedlovei
Symplocos carmencitae
Symplocos globosa, synonym of Symplocos ecuadorica
Symplocos junghuhnii
Symplocos nairii
Symplocos nivea
Symplocos oligandra
Symplocos pluribracteata
Symplocos shilanensis
Symplocos truncata

Subspecies
Symplocos pulchra subsp. coriacea
Varieties
Symplocos diversifolia var. appressa
Symplocos diversifolia var. diversifolia

Sapotaceae

Chrysophyllum azaguieanum
Chrysophyllum imperiale
Chrysophyllum lanatum
Chrysophyllum subspinosum
Isonandra stocksii
Isonandra villosa
Leptostylis gatopensis
Madhuca bourdillonii
Madhuca calcicola
Madhuca diplostemon
Madhuca microphylla
Madhuca neriifolia
Manilkara bella
Manilkara dardanoi
Manilkara decrescens
Manilkara elata
Manilkara excisa
Manilkara kanosiensis
Manilkara longifolia
Manilkara mayarensis
Manilkara multifida
Manilkara nicholsonii
Micropholis emarginata
Micropholis retusa
Micropholis submarginalis
Mimusops penduliflora
Neolemonniera clitandrifolia
Palaquium canaliculatum
Palaquium ravii
Pouteria amapaensis
Pouteria andarahiensis
Pouteria bracteata
Pouteria brevensis
Pouteria brevipedicellata
Pouteria brevipetiolata
Pouteria butyrocarpa
Pouteria coelomatica
Pouteria contermina
Pouteria cubensis
Pouteria danikeri
Pouteria decussata
Pouteria exstaminodia
Pouteria fulva
Pouteria hotteana
Pouteria juruana
Pouteria kaalaensis
Pouteria latianthera
Pouteria macahensis
Pouteria micrantha
Pouteria minima
Pouteria moaensis
Pouteria oxypetala
Pouteria pallida
Pouteria pinifolia
Pouteria psammophila
Pouteria rhynchocarpa
Pouteria tarumanensis
Pradosia kuhlmannii
Pycnandra blanchonii
Sideroxylon angustum
Sideroxylon excavatum
Synsepalum subverticillatum
Synsepalum tsounkpe
Tieghemella africana
Tieghemella heckelii, cherry mahogany

Ebenaceae

Diospyros acuta
Diospyros alboflavescens
Diospyros attenuata
Diospyros crassiflora
Diospyros crumenata
Diospyros ebenoides
Diospyros esmereg
Diospyros gillisonii
Diospyros insularis
Diospyros korupensis
Diospyros kotoensis
Diospyros magogoana
Diospyros nummulariifolia
Diospyros onanae
Diospyros oppositifolia
Diospyros philippinensis
Diospyros shimbaensis

Celastrales
There are 43 species in the order Celastrales assessed as endangered.

Icacinaceae
Calatola columbiana
Pyrenacantha cordicula

Hollies

Ilex arisanensis
Ilex brachyphylla
Ilex chengkouensis
Ilex chuniana
Ilex dabieshanensis
Ilex euryoides
Ilex fengqingensis
Ilex graciliflora
Ilex jamaicana
Ilex longzhouensis
Ilex oblonga
Ilex occulta
Ilex pauciflora
Ilex peiradena
Ilex qianlingshanensis
Ilex rarasanensis
Ilex shimeica
Ilex sintenisii, Sintenis' holly
Ilex syzygiophylla
Ilex trichocarpa
Ilex tugitakayamensis
Ilex uraiensis
Ilex venulosa
Ilex wenchowensis
Ilex wugonshanensis
Ilex yuiana

Celastraceae

Euonymus assamicus
Euonymus paniculatus
Euonymus serratifolius
Euonymus thwaitesii
Loeseneriella camerunica
Maytenus cymosa, Caribbean mayten
Maytenus jamesonii
Maytenus jefeana
Microtropis densiflora
Tetrasiphon jamaicensis
Thyrsosalacia pararacemosa
Wimmeria acuminata
Wimmeria chiapensis
Wimmeria montana

Dichapetalaceae
Dichapetalum potamophilum

Myrtales
There are 227 species, four subspecies, and ten varieties in the order Myrtales assessed as endangered.

Myrtaceae
Species

Calycorectes australis
Calycorectes duarteanus
Calycorectes sellowianus
Calyptranthes discolor
Calyptranthes portoricensis
Calyptranthes rostrata
Calyptranthes thomasiana, Thomas' lidflower
Campomanesia hirsuta
Campomanesia laurifolia
Campomanesia viatoris
Eucalyptus morrisbyi, Morrisby's gum
Eugenia abbreviata
Eugenia aceitillo
Eugenia acunai
Eugenia acutisepala
Eugenia bayatensis
Eugenia crassicaulis
Eugenia daenikeri
Eugenia discifera
Eugenia eperforata
Eugenia excisa
Eugenia floccosa
Eugenia glabra
Eugenia haematocarpa
Eugenia hypoleuca
Eugenia indica
Eugenia johorensis
Eugenia koolauensis
Eugenia laurae
Eugenia mozomboensis
Eugenia nicholsii
Eugenia pustulescens
Eugenia pycnoneura
Eugenia sachetae
Eugenia salamensis
Eugenia sp. 'dagostini'
Eugenia sp. 'metzdorfii'
Eugenia sripadaense
Eugenia sulcivenia
Eugenia taipingensis
Eugenia tanaensis
Eugenia terpnophylla
Eugenia uxpanapensis
Gomidesia mugnifolia
Mitranthes nivea
Mozartia emarginata
Mozartia maestrensis
Mozartia manacalensis
Myrcia fasciata
Myrcianthes irregularis
Myrcianthes pungens
Piliocalyx eugenioides
Pimenta ferruginea
Pimenta podocarpoides
Pimenta richardii
Pseudoeugenia tenuifolia
Psidium havanense
Psidium pedicellatum
Syzygium alternifolium
Syzygium beddomei
Syzygium bourdillonii
Syzygium caryophyllatum
Syzygium chavaran
Syzygium discophorum
Syzygium fergusoni
Syzygium microphyllum
Syzygium minus
Syzygium myhendrae
Syzygium parameswaranii
Syzygium parvulum
Syzygium pendulinum
Syzygium spathulatum
Syzygium stocksii
Syzygium turbinatum
Syzygium umbrosum
Syzygium veillonii
Tristania pontianensis
Tristaniopsis polyandra
Tristaniopsis yateensis
Xanthostemon oppositifolius

Subspecies

Eugenia cotinifolia subsp. codyensis
Eugenia mabaeoides subsp. mabaeoides
Eugenia mabaeoides subsp. pedunculata
Syzygium cordatum subsp. shimbaense

Varieties

Campomanesia sessiliflora var. sessiliflora
Pimenta racemosa var. terebinthina
Syzygium assimile var. acuminata
Syzygium zeylanicum var. ellipticum

Melastomataceae
Species

Aciotis aristellata
Antherotoma clandestina
Axinaea sessilifolia
Axinaea sodiroi
Blakea acostae
Blakea brunnea
Blakea eriocalyx
Blakea formicaria
Blakea incompta
Blakea involvens
Blakea jativae
Blakea languinosa
Brachyotum ecuadorense
Brachyotum rotundifolium
Brachyotum trichocalyx
Calvoa stenophylla
Chaetogastra anderssonii syn. Tibouchina anderssonii
Cincinnobotrys letouzeyi
Clidemia ablusa
Clidemia campii
Clidemia cutucuensis
Conostegia extinctoria
Conostegia subprocera
Dissotis aprica
Dissotis arborescens
Graffenrieda grandifolia
Gravesia hylophila
Gravesia riparia
Henriettella goudotiana
Huilaea kirkbridei
Huilaea macrocarpa
Huilaea minor
Huilaea mutisiana
Huilaea penduliflora
Lijndenia procteri
Memecylon alipes
Memecylon amshoffiae
Memecylon cuneatum
Memecylon discolor
Memecylon ellipticum
Memecylon flavescens
Memecylon giganteum
Memecylon gracillimum
Memecylon macrophyllum
Memecylon magnifoliatum
Memecylon revolutum
Memecylon semseii
Memecylon sp. 1
Memecylon subramanii
Meriania acostae
Meriania ampla
Meriania campii
Meriania costata
Meriania loxensis
Meriania maguirei
Meriania panamensis
Meriania peltata
Meriania stellata
Miconia ascendens
Miconia asplundii
Miconia aspratilis
Miconia barbipilis
Miconia beneolens
Miconia castrensis
Miconia centrosperma
Miconia collayensis
Miconia corazonica
Miconia cuprea
Miconia cutucuensis
Miconia dodsonii
Miconia espinosae
Miconia fosbergii
Miconia fuliginosa
Miconia glyptophylla
Miconia guayaquilensis
Miconia hirsutivena
Miconia inanis
Miconia ledifolia
Miconia macbrydeana
Miconia medusa
Miconia nasella
Miconia nubicola
Miconia oligantha
Miconia ombrophila
Miconia onaensis
Miconia pailasana
Miconia pausana
Miconia pilaloensis
Miconia poecilantha
Miconia prietoi
Miconia prominens
Miconia pseudorigida
Miconia vesca
Miconia villonacensis
Mouriri completens
Ossaea incerta
Ossaea palenquensis
Tessmannianthus gordonii
Tessmannianthus quadridomius
Tetrazygia albicans
Topobea cutucuensis
Topobea eplingii
Topobea macbrydei
Topobea maguirei
Topobea toachiensis
Topobea verrucosa
Triolena asplundii
Triolena campii
Tristemma schliebenii
Warneckea austro-occidentalis
Warneckea mangrovensis
Warneckea maritima
Warneckea melindensis
Warneckea schliebenii
Warneckea wildeana

Varieties

Clidemia crossosepala var. adamsii
Gravesia pulchra var. glandulosa
Gravesia pulchra var. pulchra
Miconia quadrangularis var. glandulosa
Mouriri emarginata var. rostrata

Combretaceae

Anogeissus bentii
Buchenavia iguaratensis
Buchenavia pabstii
Buchenavia rabelloana
Bucida ophiticola
Combretum esteriense
Pteleopsis habeensis
Terminalia arbuscula, white olive
Terminalia archipelagi
Terminalia bucidoides
Terminalia cherrieri
Terminalia eriostachya
Terminalia exelliana
Terminalia diptera

Thymelaeaceae

Daphne sophia
Daphnopsis grandis
Gnidia bojeriana
Octolepis oblanceolata
Stephanodaphne humbertii
Wikstroemia bicornuta

Lythraceae
Species

Ammannia nagpurensis
Lagerstroemia langkawiensis
Lagerstroemia minuticarpa
Nesaea aurita
Nesaea linearis
Nesaea maxima
Nesaea parkeri
Nesaea stuhlmannii
Nesaea triflora
Rotala cookii
Rotala ritchiei

Varieties
Nesaea parkeri var. parkeri

Onagraceae
Fuchsia hypoleuca
Fuchsia scherffiana

Sapindales
There are 121 species, three subspecies, and seven varieties in the order Sapindales assessed as endangered.

Rutaceae
Species

Balfourodendron riedelianum
Decatropis paucijuga
Decazyx macrophyllus
Erythrochiton giganteus
Esenbeckia alata
Fagara mezoneurospinosa
Flindersia ifflaiana
Flindersia pimenteliana
Glycosmis monticola
Glycosmis tomentella
Helietta glaucescens
Limnocitrus littoralis
Melicope balloui, rock pelea
Melicope christophersenii
Melicope cinerea
Melicope indica
Melicope lunu-ankenda
Melicope makahae
Melicope orbicularis, orbicular pelea
Melicope ovalis, wild pelea
Melicope pallida
Melicope puberula
Melicope saint-johnii, St John's pelea
Melicope sandwicensis
Melicope waialealae
Oxanthera fragrans
Oxanthera neocaledonica
Pitavia punctata
Platydesma remyi
Ruta microcarpa
Vepris glandulosa
Vepris heterophylla
Zanthoxylum belizense
Zanthoxylum ferrugineum
Zanthoxylum gentlei
Zanthoxylum hawaiiense
Zanthoxylum negrilense
Zanthoxylum panamense
Zanthoxylum procerum
Zanthoxylum psammophilum
Zanthoxylum thomasianum, St Thomas prickly-ash

Subspecies
Esenbeckia berlandieri subsp. litoralis
Zanthoxylum fagara subsp. aguilarii
Varieties

Picrella trifoliata var. gracilis
Picrella trifoliata var. gracillima
Vepris morogorensis var. subalata

Sapindaceae
Species

Alectryon ramiflorus
Allophylus dodsonii
Chimborazoa lachnocarpa
Cupaniopsis glabra
Cupaniopsis mouana
Cupaniopsis rosea
Cupaniopsis rotundifolia
Cupaniopsis squamosa
Cupaniopsis subfalcata
Cupaniopsis tontoutensis
Deinbollia nyasica
Euchorium cubense
Gloeocarpus patentivalvis
Guioa acuminata
Guioa discolor
Guioa myriadenia
Guioa truncata
Lecaniodiscus punctatus
Paranephelium hainanensis
Placodiscus attenuatus
Placodiscus caudatus
Placodiscus pseudostipularis
Podonephelium davidsonii
Serjania brevipes
Talisia setigera

Varieties
Eriocoelum pungens var. inermis

Anacardiaceae
Species

Cotinus nana
Mangifera andamanica
Mangifera blommesteinii
Mangifera dongnaiensis
Mangifera monandra
Mangifera nicobarica
Mangifera paludosa
Mangifera superba
Mauria membranifolia
Micronychia bemangidiensis
Micronychia danguyana
Operculicarya borealis
Operculicarya hyphaenoides
Operculicarya multijuga
Operculicarya pachypus
Poupartia pubescens
Rhus brenanii
Semecarpus acuminata
Semecarpus coriacea
Semecarpus riparia
Tapirira rubrinervis
Toxicodendron calcicolum
Trichoscypha hallei

Varieties
Nothopegia beddomei var. wynaadica

Meliaceae
Species

Carapa megistocarpa
Cedrela fissilis
Cedrela lilloi
Dysoxylum beddomei
Dysoxylum malabaricum
Guarea corrugata
Guarea crispa
Khaya madagascariensis
Ruagea microphylla
Swietenia mahagoni, American mahogany
Trichilia blanchetii
Trichilia breviflora
Trichilia discolor
Trichilia elsae
Trichilia pungens
Trichilia surumuensis
Trichilia tetrapetala
Trichilia trachyantha
Turraea barbata
Turraea kimbozensis

Subspecies
Trichilia lepidota subsp. lepidota

Burseraceae
Species

Bursera hollickii
Canarium kipella
Canarium paniculatum
Dacryodes colombiana

Varieties
Santiria rubiginosa var. pedicellata

Other Sapindales
Species

Bersama swynnertonii
Bretschneidera sinensis
Brucea macrocarpa
Bulnesia carrapo
Dipteronia dyeriana
Guaiacum officinale, commoner lignum vitae
Guaiacum sanctum, Holywood lignum vitae
Recchia simplicifolia

Varieties
Ailanthus altissima var. tanakai

Asterales
Species

Aequatorium asterotrichum
Aequatorium lepidotum
Aetheolaena decipiens
Aetheolaena mochensis
Aetheolaena subinvolucrata
Aphanactis barclayae
Argyranthemum lidii
Argyranthemum thalassophilum
Aristeguietia chimborazensis
Artemisia granatensis, royal chamomile
Aster pyrenaeus
Aster sorrentinii
Atractylis arbuscula
Atractylis preauxiana
Badilloa atrescens
Barnadesia ciliata
Bartlettina campii
Bidens cosmoides
Bidens valida
Brachyglottis arborescens, Three Kings rangiora
Calea huigrensis
Carlina diae
Centaurea borjae
Centaurea gymnocarpa
Centaurea hajastana, Hayastanian centaury
Centaurea horrida
Centaurea princeps
Centaurea rhizocalathium, root-headed centaury
Centaurea woronowii, Woronow's centaury
Centauropsis decaryi
Centauropsis perrieri
Cheirolophus falcisectus
Cheirolophus ghomerythus
Cheirolophus junonianus
Cheirolophus massonianus
Chuquiraga arcuata
Cineraria longipes
Cirsium albowianum, Albov's thistle
Cirsium czerkessicum, Cherkessian thistle
Clibadium rhytidophyllum
Clibadium websteri
Cousinia araxena, Araxian cousinia
Cousinia gabrieljaniae, Gabrielyan's cousinia
Cousinia iljinii, Ilyin's cousinia
Cousinia lomakinii, Lomakin's cousinia
Cousinia takhtajanii, Takhtadjan's cousinia
Crepis crocifolia
Crepis granatensis
Critoniopsis dorrii
Critoniopsis yamboyensis
Cronquistianthus rosei
Crossothamnus gentryi
Cuatrecasanthus flexipappus
Dendrophorbium amplexicaule
Dendrophorbium angelense
Dendrophorbium gesnerifolium
Diplostephium crypteriophyllum
Diplostephium juniperinum
Diplostephium ramiglabrum
Dubautia arborea, tree dubautia
Dubautia microcephala, small-head dubautia
Echinops sintenisii, Sintensis' globe thistle
Elaphandra paucipunctata
Erigeron frigidus
Erigeron incertus, hairy daisy
Erigeron pauper
Erigeron schalbusi, Shalbusian fleabane
Ethulia scheffleri
Gamochaeta antarctica, Antarctic cudweed
Gnaphalium ecuadorense
Gnaphalium sepositum
Grosvenoria campii
Guevaria loxensis
Gynoxys campii
Gynoxys chagalensis
Gynoxys ignaciana
Gynoxys validifolia
Haplopappus albicans
Helichrysum monogynum
Helichrysum sp. C
Helichrysum sp. D
Hieracium adenobrachion, glandular-branched hawkweed
Hieracium caucasiense, Caucasian hawkweed
Idiopappus saloyensis
Joseanthus chimborazensis
Joseanthus cuatrecasasii
Jungia crenatifolia
Jungia glandulifera
Jurinea galushkoi, Galushko's jurinea
Jurinea iljinii, Iljin's jurinea
Jurinea praetermissa, neglected jurinea
Jurinea sosnowskyi, Sosnovsky's jurinea
Kaunia pachanoi
Kingianthus paradoxus
Koanophyllon panamensis
Lactuca watsoniana
Lamprachaenium microcephalum
Lepidaploa violiceps
Lipotriche tithonioides, Simandou daisy
Llerasia fuliginea
Loricaria azuayensis
Lycoseris eggersii
Mikania millei
Mikania pulverulenta
Monactis anderssonii
Monticalia angustifolia
Mtonia glandulifera
Munnozia canarensis
Mutisia hieronymi
Mutisia lehmannii
Mutisia microneura
Olearia hectori, deciduous tree daisy
Olearia polita
Oritrophium tergoalbum
Pappobolus argenteus
Pentacalia cazaletii
Pentacalia gibbiflora
Pentacalia pailasensis
Pentacalia riotintis
Petrobium arboreum, whitewood
Picris willkommii
Podospermum grigoraschvilii, Grigorashvili's salsify
Podospermum schischkinii, Shishkin's salsify
Prenanthes amabilis
Psephellus appendicigerus, appendage-bearing centaury
Psephellus boissieri, Boissier's psephellus
Psephellus cronquistii, Cronquists's cornflower
Psephellus debedicus, Debedian cornflower
Psephellus galushkoi, Galushko's psephellus
Psephellus geghamensis, Geghamian cornflower
Psephellus manakyanii, Manakyan's cornflower
Psephellus pecho
Psephellus ruprechtii, Ruprecht's centaury
Psephellus straminicephalus, straw-coloured-headed centaury
Psephellus taochius
Psephellus troitzkyi, Troitsky's psephellus
Psephellus zangezuri, Zangezurian cornflower
Pseudogynoxys engleri
Pulicaria aromatica
Pulicaria dioscorides
Remya kauaiensis
Scalesia cordata, heart-leafed scalesia
Scalesia microcephala
Scorzonera safievii, Safiev's salsify
Senecio elodes
Stemmacantha cynaroides
Stenopadus andicola
Stevia anisostemma
Sventenia bupleuroides
Talamancalia fosbergii, synonym of Lomanthus fosbergii
Tanacetum ptarmiciflorum
Tolpis glabrescens
Tragopogon armeniacus, Armenian salsify
Tragopogon meskheticus, Meskhetian goat's beard
Tripleurospermum fissurale, fissural tripleurospermum
Verbesina barclayae
Verbesina ecuatoriana
Verbesina harlingii
Verbesina minuticeps
Verbesina villonacoensis
Vernonia duvigneaudii
Vernonia nonoensis
Wagenitzia lancifolia
Xenophyllum acerosum

Subspecies

Bidens micrantha subsp. kalealaha
Dubautia knudsenii subsp. filiformis, Knudsen's dubautia
Dubautia knudsenii subsp. knudsenii
Dubautia knudsenii subsp. nagatae
Senecio lagascanus subsp. lusitanicus

Varieties

Scalesia microcephala var. cordifolia
Scalesia microcephala var. microcephala
Urbananthus critoniformis var. pubescens

Magnoliales
There are 166 species and six subspecies in the order Magnoliales assessed as endangered.

Canellaceae

Cinnamodendron cubense
Warburgia elongata
Warburgia salutaris, pepper bark tree

Winteraceae
Takhtajania perrieri
Zygogynum oligostigma

Magnoliaceae
Species

Magnolia allenii
Magnolia angustioblonga
Magnolia arcabucoana
Magnolia argyrothricha
Magnolia aromatica
Magnolia bidoupensis
Magnolia boliviana
Magnolia calophylla
Magnolia caricifragrans
Magnolia cattienensis
Magnolia chocoensis
Magnolia cochranei
Magnolia coriacea
Magnolia crassipes
Magnolia cristalensis
Magnolia dawsoniana
Magnolia decastroi
Magnolia decidua
Magnolia gentryi
Magnolia georgii
Magnolia gilbertoi
Magnolia guanacastensis
Magnolia guatapensis
Magnolia guerrerensis
Magnolia hamorii
Magnolia henaoi
Magnolia hernandezii
Magnolia inbioana
Magnolia irwiniana
Magnolia jaenensis
Magnolia jaliscana
Magnolia juninensis
Magnolia kachirachirai
Magnolia kichuana
Magnolia krusei
Magnolia lacei
Magnolia lenticellata
Magnolia lotungensis
Magnolia lucida
Magnolia madidiensis
Magnolia mahechae
Magnolia morii
Magnolia nana
Magnolia neillii
Magnolia neomagnifolia
Magnolia nuevoleonensis
Magnolia oaxacensis
Magnolia odoratissima
Magnolia officinalis
Magnolia pacifica
Magnolia palandana
Magnolia pallescens
Magnolia pastazaensis
Magnolia patungensis
Magnolia pealiana
Magnolia pedrazae
Magnolia perezfarrerae
Magnolia portoricensis
Magnolia pugana
Magnolia quetzal
Magnolia rostrata
Magnolia rufibarbata
Magnolia rzedowskiana
Magnolia santanderiana
Magnolia sharpii
Magnolia shiluensis
Magnolia shuarorum
Magnolia silvioi
Magnolia sinostellata
Magnolia sirindhorniae
Magnolia splendens
Magnolia stellata, star magnolia
Magnolia striatifolia
Magnolia sulawesiana
Magnolia tamaulipana
Magnolia urraoensis
Magnolia vazquezii
Magnolia ventii
Magnolia viridipetala
Magnolia vovidesii
Magnolia wetteri
Magnolia xanthantha
Magnolia yantzazana
Magnolia yarumalensis, purple turkey

Subspecies

Magnolia cubensis subsp. cacuminicola
Magnolia cubensis subsp. cubensis
Magnolia cubensis subsp. turquinensis

Annonaceae
Species

Alphonsea hainanensis
Alphonsea tsangyuanensis
Anaxagorea phaeocarpa
Annickia kummerae
Annona conica
Annona deceptrix
Annona oligocarpa
Artabotrys darainensis
Artabotrys rupestris
Asimina tetramera, four-petal pawpaw
Asteranthe lutea
Cymbopetalum mayanum
Desmos yunnanensis
Fissistigma cupreonitens
Goniothalamus cheliensis
Goniothalamus gardneri
Goniothalamus rhynchantherus
Goniothalamus simonsii
Guatteria jefensis
Guatteria pastazae
Hexalobus salicifolius
Isolona cauliflora
Isolona heinsenii
Klarobelia lucida
Klarobelia megalocarpa
Monanthotaxis dictyoneura
Monanthotaxis discolor
Monanthotaxis discrepantinervia
Monanthotaxis faulknerae
Monocyclanthus vignei
Monodora carolinae
Mosannona pacifica
Orophea thomsoni
Polyalthia litseifolia
Polyalthia pingpienensis
Polyalthia rufescens
Polyalthia shendurunii
Polyalthia tanganyikensis
Polyalthia verdcourtii
Polyalthia verrucipes
Polyceratocarpus scheffleri
Popowia beddomeana
Rollinia boliviana
Rollinia calcarata
Rollinia ferruginea
Rollinia pachyantha
Sageraea grandiflora
Sageraea thwaitesii
Sanrafaelia ruffonammari
Stenanona panamensis
Toussaintia orientalis
Toussaintia patriciae
Uvaria ambongoensis
Uvaria dependens
Uvaria faulknerae
Uvaria kweichowensis
Uvaria pandensis
Uvariodendron gorgonis
Uvariodendron magnificum
Uvariodendron oligocarpum
Uvariodendron pycnophyllum
Uvariodendron usambarense
Uvariopsis bisexualis
Uvariopsis korupensis
Uvariopsis submontana
Xylopia collina
Xylopia flexuosa
Xylopia longifolia
Xylopia mwasumbii

Subspecies
Greenwayodendron suaveolens subsp. usambaricum

Myristicaceae
Species

Bicuiba oleifera
Horsfieldia obscurineria
Horsfieldia pandurifolia
Iryanthera campinae
Myristica magnifica
Myristica teijsmannii
Virola megacarpa
Virola surinamensis, baboonwood

Subspecies
Myristica beddomei subsp. sphaerocarpa
Myristica beddomei subsp. ustulata

Capparales
There are 30 species in Capparales assessed as endangered.

Capparaceae

Capparis heterophylla
Capparis pachyphylla
Podandrogyne brevipedunculata
Podandrogyne jamesonii

Cruciferae

Alyssum artvinense, Artvinian alyssum
Barbarea grandiflora, large-flowered barbarea
Barbarea lepuznica
Barbarea lutea, Artvinian barbarea
Brassica hilarionis
Cochlearia polonica, Polish scurvy-grass
Coincya rupestris
Crambe armena, Armenian sea-kale
Crambe laevigata
Crambe microcarpa
Crambe pritzelii
Crambe scoparia
Draba aretioides
Draba extensa
Erysimum leptocarpum, thin-fruited treacle mustard
Erysimum wagifii, treacle mustard
Eudema nubigena
Isatis karjaginii, Karyagin's woad
Lepidium filicaule
Lepidium serra
Nasturtium africanum
Nesocrambe socotrana
Phlebolobium maclovianum, Falkland rock-cress
Sinapidendron frutescens
Sinapidendron sempervivifolium
Sisymbrella dentata

Apiales
There are 63 species and one variety in the order Apiales assessed as endangered.

Araliaceae
Species

Brassaiopsis acuminata
Brassaiopsis kwangsiensis
Cheirodendron dominii, Domin's club
Eleutherococcus brachypus
Eleutherococcus cuspidatus
Eleutherococcus setulosus
Eleutherococcus stenophyllus
Eleutherococcus verticillatus
Euaraliopsis dumicola syn. Brassaiopsis dumicola
Heteropanax nitentifolius
Heteropanax yunnanensis
Oreopanax corazonensis
Oreopanax impolitus
Panax zingiberensis
Plerandra elegantissima
Plerandra pachyphylla
Plerandra sp. "calcicola"
Plerandra sp. "longistyla"
Polyscias albersiana
Polyscias dichroostachya
Polyscias mauritiana
Polyscias nothisii
Polyscias quintasii
Polyscias stuhlmannii
Polyscias waialealae
Polyscias waimeae
Schefflera agamae
Schefflera albido-bracteata
Schefflera bourdillonii
Schefflera cephalotes
Schefflera curranii
Schefflera fastigiata
Schefflera insignis
Schefflera kontumensis
Schefflera lukwangulensis
Schefflera multifoliolata
Schefflera palawanensis
Schefflera palmiformis
Schefflera stearnii
Schefflera veitchii

Varieties
Polyscias sechellarum var. sechellarum

Umbelliferae

Angelica adzharica, Adjarian angelica
Angelica glauca
Astrantia colchica, Colchic masterwort
Berula burchellii, dwarf jellico
Bilacunaria caspia, Caspian bilacunaria
Bupleurum euphorbioides
Bupleurum handiense
Bupleurum schistosum, divided thoroughwax
Carum asinorum
Carum komarovii, Komarov's caraway
Cryptotaenia calycina
Cryptotaenia polygama
Eryngium galioides
Eryngium viviparum
Ferula sadleriana
Heracleum egrissicum, Egrissian cow-parsnip
Hydrocotyle conferta
Laserpitium affine, similar laserwort
Lefebvrea camerunensis
Petagnaea gussonei
Pimpinella tirupatiensis
Polylophium panjutinii, Panjutin's polylophium
Seseli intricatum

Gentianales
There are 64 species and two varieties in the order Gentianales assessed as endangered.

Apocynaceae
Species

Alstonia annamensis
Alyxia menglungensis
Alyxia taiwanensis
Aspidosperma darienense
Aspidosperma polyneuron
Baissea ochrantha
Cameraria microphylla
Cerberiopsis neriifolia
Hunteria ghanensis
Kibatalia borneensis
Kibatalia puberula
Kibatalia stenopetala
Landolphia uniflora
Malouetia barbata
Mandevilla dodsonii
Mandevilla equatorialis
Neisosperma sevenetii syn. Ochrosia sevenetii
Ochrosia borbonica
Ochrosia haleakalae
Ochrosia kauaiensis
Pachypodium baronii
Parepigynum funingense
Petchia africana
Prestonia peregrina
Prestonia rotundifolia
Pteralyxia kauaiensis, Kauai pteralyxia
Tabernaemontana cumata
Tabernaemontana muricata
Tabernaemontana ovalifolia
Tabernaemontana persicariifolia

Varieties
Carissa edulis var. sechellensis

Loganiaceae
Species

Geniostoma stipulare
Labordia kaalae
Labordia lydgatei
Neuburgia macroloba

Varieties
Labordia tinifolia var. lanaiensis

Asclepiadaceae

Brachystelma exile
Ceropegia aridicola
Ceropegia ledermannii
Cynanchum campii
Cynanchum chanchanense
Cynanchum intricatum
Cynanchum jaramilloi
Decalepis hamiltonii
Epistemma decurrens
Gonolobus campii
Gymnema khandalense
Marsdenia exellii
Matelea chimboracensis
Matelea fimbriatiflora
Matelea honorana
Metastelma purpurascens
Pachycarpus medusonema
Raphionacme caerulea
Raphionacme keayi
Secamone schimperiana
Xysmalobium samoritourei

Gentianaceae

Gentianella androsacea
Gentianella flaviflora
Gentianella fuscicaulis
Gentianella gracilis
Gentianella hirculus
Gentianella jamesonii
Gentianella longibarbata
Gentianella polyantha
Halenia serpyllifolia

Rosales
There are 77 species, four subspecies, and four varieties in the order Rosales assessed as endangered.

Chrysobalanaceae

Atuna indica
Atuna travancorica
Dactyladenia cinerea
Dactyladenia hirsuta
Dactyladenia laevis
Dactyladenia mannii
Hirtella enneandra
Hirtella pauciflora
Hunga cordata
Kostermanthus malayanus
Licania fasciculata
Licania longicuspidata
Licania megalophylla
Licania salicifolia
Magnistipula conrauana
Magnistipula cuneatifolia

Brunelliaceae
Species

Brunellia almaguerensis
Brunellia darienensis
Brunellia ecuadoriensis
Brunellia elliptica
Brunellia morii
Brunellia pauciflora
Brunellia penderiscana
Brunellia rufa
Brunellia zamorensis

Subspecies
Brunellia comocladifolia subsp. boyacensis
Brunellia littlei subsp. caucana

Pittosporaceae

Pittosporum aliferum
Pittosporum brevispinum
Pittosporum eriocarpum
Pittosporum gayanum
Pittosporum gomonenense
Pittosporum muricatum
Pittosporum napaliense
Pittosporum ornatum
Pittosporum patulum, pitpat
Pittosporum stenophyllum

Cunoniaceae
Species

Acsmithia vitiense
Geissois imthurnii
Geissois stipularis
Spiraeanthemum graeffei
Spiraeanthemum serratum
Weinmannia costulata

Varieties
Geissois ternata var. minor

Rosaceae
Species

Amygdalus ledebouriana
Armeniaca vulgaris, wild apricot
Crataegus nigra, Hungarian thorn
Malus komarovii
Malus niedzwetzkyana
Marcetella maderensis
Prunus adenopoda
Prunus ceylanica
Prunus choreiana
Prunus pulgarensis
Prunus rubiginosa
Prunus tadzhikistanica
Prunus turfosa
Pyracantha koidzumii
Pyrus cajon
Pyrus daralagezi, Daralagezian pear
Pyrus hajastana, Hayastanyan pear
Pyrus nutans, drooping pear
Pyrus sosnovskyi, Sosnovsky's pear
Pyrus tamamschianae, Tamamshyan's pear
Pyrus theodorovii, Teodorov's pear
Rosa sosnovskyana, Sosnovsky's rose
Rubus zangezurus, Zangezurian blackberry
Sorbus bristoliensis, Bristol whitebeam
Sorbus multicrenata
Spiraeanthus schrenkianus

Subspecies
Prunus lusitanica subsp. azorica
Prunus lusitanica subsp. lusitanica
Varieties
Photinia serratifolia var. tomentosa

Other Rosales
Species

Aeonium gomerense
Cardiandra amamiohsimensis
Connarus brachybotryosus
Deutzia paniculata
Deutzia yaeyamensis
Hemandradenia chevalieri
Kirengeshoma palmata
Saxifraga presolanensis
Saxifraga tombeanensis

Varieties
Grevea eggelingii var. echinocarpa
Grevea eggelingii var. keniensis

Primulales
There are 21 species in Primulales assessed as endangered.

Myrsinaceae

Ardisia amplexicaulis
Ardisia blatteri
Ardisia brittonii
Ardisia colonensis
Ardisia dukei
Ardisia eugenioides
Ardisia glomerata
Ardisia koupensis
Ardisia microcalyx
Ardisia rufa
Ardisia scheryi
Ardisia sonchifolia
Geissanthus fallenae
Geissanthus pinchinchana
Maesa velutina
Myrsine knudsenii
Myrsine linearifolia
Myrsine petiolata
Parathesis vulgata
Rapanea striata

Primulaceae
Primula palinuri

Rhamnales
Species

Colubrina nicholsonii
Doerpfeldia cubensis
Rhamnidium dictyophyllum
Sarcomphalus havanensis
Ziziphus robertsoniana

Varieties
Rhamnus capraeifolia var. matudai

Urticales
There are 24 species, one subspecies, and three varieties in Urticales assessed as endangered.

Urticaceae
Species

Laportea urentissima
Pilea riopalenquensis
Pilea tungurahuae

Varieties
Boehmeria australis var. dealbata

Ulmaceae

Celtis hypoleuca
Ulmus chenmoui
Zelkova abelicea

Cecropiaceae
Cecropia longipes
Coussapoa tolimensis

Moraceae
Species

Brosimum glaziovii
Dorstenia astyanactis
Dorstenia dionga
Ficus andamanica
Ficus aripuanensis
Ficus blepharophylla
Ficus cyclophylla
Ficus meizonochlamys
Ficus muelleriana
Ficus ramiflora
Ficus roraimensis
Ficus salzmanniana
Ficus ursina
Helicostylis heterotricha
Pseudolmedia hirtula
Sorocea sarcocarpa

Subspecies
Brosimum utile subsp. magdalenense
Varieties
Dorstenia holstii var. holstii
Ficus cotinifolia var. hondurensis

Solanales

Brunfelsia portoricensis, Puerto Rico raintree
Cestrum chimborazinum
Cestrum dielsii
Cobaea aequatoriensis
Cobaea campanulata
Convolvulus lopezsocasii
Convolvulus ruprechtii, Ruprecht's bindweed
Cuscuta prismatica
Goetzea elegans, beautiful goetzea
Ipomoea flavivillosa
Larnax steyermarkii
Lycianthes rimbachii
Markea fosbergii
Nierembergia espinosae
Nothocestrum latifolium
Nymphoides herzogii
Nymphoides krishnakesara
Solanum albornozii
Solanum carchiense
Solanum chimborazense
Solanum hugonis
Solanum paralum
Solanum sycocarpum

Scrophulariales
There are 216 species, 11 subspecies, and two varieties in the order Scrophulariales assessed as endangered.

Oleaceae
Species

Abeliophyllum distichum, white forsythia
Chionanthus adamsii
Chionanthus caymanensis
Chionanthus linocieroides
Forsythia ovata
Fraxinus chiisanensis
Ligustrum microcarpum
Picconia azorica
Priogymnanthus apertus, Francisco

Varieties
Chionanthus caymanensis var. longipetala
Chionanthus leprocarpa var. courtallensis

Buddlejaceae
Buddleja ibarrensis

Gesneriaceae
Species

Columnea atahualpae
Columnea flexiflora
Columnea schimpffii
Corytoplectus cutucuensis
Cremosperma auriculatum
Cyrtandra cyaneoides
Cyrtandra giffardii, Giffard's cyrtandra
Cyrtandra heinrichii
Cyrtandra oenobarba
Damrongia fulva
Drymonia ecuadorensis
Drymonia laciniosa
Drymonia rhodoloma
Drymonia utuanensis
Gasteranthus bilsaensis
Gasteranthus carinatus
Gasteranthus crispus
Gasteranthus macrocalyx
Gasteranthus mutabilis
Gasteranthus orientandinus
Gasteranthus perennis
Gasteranthus tenellus
Gasteranthus ternatus
Gasteranthus timidus
Henckelia smitinandii
Monopyle sodiroana
Monopyle stenoloba
Oreocharis hirsuta
Paraboea amplifolia
Paraboea argentea
Paraboea chiangdaoensis
Paraboea glabra
Paraboea glabrescens
Paraboea longipetiolata
Paraboea patens
Paraboea rabilii
Paradrymonia binata
Paradrymonia hypocyrta
Paradrymonia lacera
Pearcea bilabiata
Pearcea gracilis
Pearcea intermedia
Reldia calcarata
Saintpaulia goetzeana
Saintpaulia inconspicua
Saintpaulia shumensis
Streptocarpus albus
Streptocarpus bambuseti
Streptocarpus bullatus
Streptocarpus gonjaensis
Streptocarpus heckmannianus
Streptocarpus stomandrus
Streptocarpus subscandens
Tetraphyllum roseum

Subspecies

Saintpaulia ionantha subsp. nitida
Saintpaulia ionantha subsp. orbicularis
Saintpaulia ionantha subsp. velutina
Streptocarpus albus subsp. albus
Streptocarpus albus subsp. edwardsii
Streptocarpus heckmannianus subsp. gracilis
Streptocarpus heckmannianus subsp. heckmannianus

Bignoniaceae

Amphitecna molinae
Colea colei
Colea seychellarum
Ekmanianthe longiflora
Fernandoa lutea
Parmentiera cereifera
Parmentiera dressleri
Spirotecoma holguinensis
Synapsis ilicifolia
Tabebuia elongata

Acanthaceae
Species

Acanthus austromontanus
Angkalanthus oligophylla
Anisosepalum lewallei
Anisotes spectabilis
Anisotes tangensis
Anisotes ukambensis
Anisotes umbrosus
Anisotes zenkeri
Aphelandra azuayensis
Aphelandra cinnabarina
Aphelandra galba
Aphelandra guayasii
Aphelandra harlingii
Aphelandra loxensis
Aphelandra phaina
Asystasia linearis
Asystasia lorata
Asystasia schliebenii
Asystasia tanzaniensis
Barleria amanensis
Barleria aristata
Barleria brevituba
Barleria decaisniana
Barleria dulcis
Barleria faulknerae
Barleria insolita
Barleria laceratiflora
Barleria laeta
Barleria leandrii
Barleria limnogeton
Barleria longipes
Barleria lukei
Barleria maculata
Barleria penelopeana
Barleria perrieri
Barleria popovii
Barleria pseudosomalia
Barleria vollesenii
Barleria whytei
Blepharis crinita
Blepharis ilicifolia
Blepharis kenyensis
Blepharis maculata
Blepharis pusilla
Blepharis tanzaniensis
Brachystephanus laxispicatus
Brachystephanus roseus
Brillantaisia richardsiae
Brillantaisia stenopteris
Cephalophis lukei
Chlamydocardia subrhomboidea
Crabbea longipes
Crossandra cephalostachya
Crossandra humbertii
Crossandra isaloensis
Crossandra nobilis
Crossandra obanensis
Crossandra pilosa
Crossandra poissonii
Crossandra quadridentata
Cystacanthus affinis
Dicliptera cicatricosa
Dicliptera cordibracteata
Dicliptera grandiflora
Dicliptera napierae
Dischistocalyx champluvieranus
Duosperma latifolium
Duosperma porotoense
Duosperma trachyphyllum
Dyschoriste kitongaensis
Dyschoriste nyassica
Dyschoriste sinica
Ecbolium benoistii
Heteradelphia paulojaegeria
Hygrophila albobracteata
Hygrophila mediatrix
Hygrophila richardsiae
Isoglossa anisophylla
Isoglossa bondwaensis
Isoglossa candelabrum
Isoglossa faulknerae
Isoglossa oreacanthoides
Isoglossa variegata
Isoglossa ventricosa
Justicia beloperonoides
Justicia breviracemosa
Justicia euosmia
Justicia faulknerae
Justicia leucoxiphos
Justicia mariae
Justicia niassensis
Justicia obtusicapsula
Justicia petterssonii
Justicia pinensis
Justicia roseobracteata
Justicia takhinensis
Justicia telloensis
Justicia tenuipes
Kudoacanthus albonervosus
Lepidagathis madagascariensis
Lepidagathis mucida
Lepidagathis plantaginea
Lepidagathis pseudoaristata
Mellera congdonii
Mimulopsis macrantha
Neuracanthus aculeatus
Odontonema laxum
Phaulopsis pulchella
Physacanthus talbotii
Podorungia lantzei
Podorungia serotina
Pseuderanthemum usambarense
Sclerochiton preussii
Staurogyne pseudocapitata
Staurogyne sichuanica
Stenandrium thomense
Stenostephanus asplundii
Stenostephanus harlingii
Stenostephanus laxus
Thunbergia rufescens

Subspecies

Barleria polhillii subsp. latiloba
Duosperma longicalyx subsp. magadiense
Duosperma longicalyx subsp. mkomaziense
Neuracanthus tephrophyllus subsp. tsavoensis

Scrophulariaceae

Ameroglossum pernambucense
Antirrhinum lopesianum
Antirrhinum subbaeticum
Calceolaria australis
Calceolaria bentae
Calceolaria commutata
Calceolaria frondosa
Calceolaria gossypina
Calceolaria grandiflora
Calceolaria lavandulifolia
Calceolaria martinezii
Calceolaria obtusa
Calceolaria odontophylla
Calceolaria platyzyga
Calceolaria semiconnata
Isoplexis isabelliana, cresta de gallo
Linaria tonzigii
Scrophularia eriocalyx
Veronica transcaucasica, spicate pseudolysimachion

Lentibulariaceae

Genlisea angolensis
Pinguicula nevadensis
Utricularia cecilii

Lamiales
There are 55 species and three subspecies in the order Lamiales assessed as endangered.

Verbenaceae

Aegiphila lopez-palacii
Aegiphila monticola
Aegiphila schimpffii
Aloysia dodsoniorum
Oxera balansae
Vitex cooperi
Vitex evoluta
Vitex gaumeri, fiddlewood
Vitex kuylenii
Vitex lehmbachii
Xolocotzia asperifolia

Labiatae

Achyrospermum seychellarum
Clinopodium libanoticum, Lebanon savory
Hyptis florida
Hyptis pseudoglauca
Micromeria leucantha
Micromeria madagascariensis
Micromeria taygetea
Nepeta alaghezi, Alaghezian catmint
Platostoma glomerulatum
Plectranthus linearifolius
Plectranthus ombrophilus
Plectranthus orbicularis
Plectranthus platyphyllus
Plectranthus scaposus
Plectranthus strangulatus
Rosmarinus tomentosus
Salvia ecuadorensis
Salvia loxensis
Salvia peregrina
Salvia unguella
Sideritis reverchonii
Stachys oligantha
Tetradenia clementiana
Tetradenia falafa
Teucrium lepicephalum
Tinnea mirabilis

Boraginaceae
Species

Anchusa crispa
Bourreria velutina
Cordia correae
Cordia protracta
Cordia rosei
Echium pininana
Echium valentinum
Ehretia glandulosissima
Lithodora nitida
Myosotis daralaghezica, Daralagezian forget-me-not
Myosotis rehsteineri
Onosma obtusifolia, amblyophyllous goldendrop
Onosma tornensis
Solenanthus albanicus
Symphytum hajastanum, Hajastanian comfrey
Symphytum podcumicum, Podkumian comfrey

Subspecies

Echium decaisnei subsp. purpuriense
Echium onosmifolium subsp. spectabile
Omphalodes littoralis subsp. gallaecica

Linderniaceae
Lindernia manilaliana
Lindernia minima

Nepenthales
There are 17 species, three subspecies, and one variety in Nepenthales assessed as endangered.

Nepenthaceae

Nepenthes adnata
Nepenthes bellii
Nepenthes boschiana
Nepenthes burbidgeae
Nepenthes chaniana
Nepenthes gracillima
Nepenthes khasiana
Nepenthes klossii
Nepenthes masoalensis
Nepenthes murudensis
Nepenthes palawanensis
Nepenthes paniculata
Nepenthes rajah
Nepenthes talangensis
Nepenthes tenuis
Nepenthes truncata

Droseraceae
Aldrovanda vesiculosa, waterwheel

Sarraceniaceae
Subspecies

Sarracenia rubra subsp. gulfensis
Sarracenia rubra subsp. jonesii, mountain sweet pitcherplant
Sarracenia rubra subsp. wherryi

Varieties
Sarracenia purpurea var. montana, purple pitcherplant

Ranunculales

Aconitum heterophyllum
Anemone jamesonii
Anemone uralensis
Berberis bicolor
Berberis iteophylla
Coptis teeta
Diphylleia sinensis
Disciphania inversa
Gymnospermium microrrhynchum
Megaleranthis saniculifolia
Meliosma linearifolia
Meliosma littlei
Tiliacora lehmbachii
Triclisia lanceolata

Polygonales

Atraphaxis muschketowi, shrubby buckwheat
Calligonum matteianum
Calligonum molle
Coccoloba proctorii
Coccoloba rugosa
Rumex algeriensis
Rumex bithynicus

Podostemales

Farmeria indica
Ledermanniella annithomae
Ledermanniella bosii
Ledermanniella letouzeyi
Ledermanniella linearifolia
Ledermanniella onanae
Ledermanniella pusilla
Ledermanniella thalloidea
Ledermanniella variabilis
Leiothylax quangensis
Macropodiella pellucida
Podostemum munnarense
Terniopsis chanthaburiensis

Fabales
Species

Abrus sambiranensis
Acacia allenii
Acacia bifaria
Acacia brachypoda, western wheatbelt wattle
Acacia bucheri
Acacia chrysotricha, Newry golden wattle
Acacia daemon
Acacia menabeensis
Acacia repanda
Acacia zapatensis
Acmispon prostratus syn. Lotus nuttallianus, Nuttall's lotus
Adenocarpus ombriosus
Aeschynomene laxiflora
Afzelia xylocarpa
Albizia plurijuga
Albizia suluensis, Zulu albizia
Amburana cearensis
Anagyris latifolia
Aspalathus glabrescens
Aspalathus macrantha
Aspalathus psoraleoides
Aspalathus varians
Astragalus acetabulosus
Astragalus alamliensis
Astragalus albanicus, Albanian astragalus
Astragalus altus, tall milkvetch
Astragalus bidentatus
Astragalus bobrovii
Astragalus cuscutae, dodder astragalus
Astragalus drupaceus
Astragalus maraziensis, Marazinian astragalus
Astragalus tener, gray slender milkvetch
Astragalus vardziae, Vardzian astragalus
Ateleia gummifera
Baikiaea ghesquiereana
Baphia obanensis
Baphia pauloi
Baphia puguensis
Baudouinia sollyaeformis
Bauhinia flagelliflora
Bauhinia haughtii
Bauhinia integerrima
Bauhinia mombassae
Bauhinia pervilleana
Bauhinia stenantha
Behaimia cubensis
Berlinia hollandii
Bikinia breynei
Brongniartia guerrerensis
Brownea santanderensis
Browneopsis disepala
Bussea eggelingii
Cadia pubescens
Caesalpinia echinata
Caesalpinia phyllanthoides, creeping bird of paradise
Calliandra glyphoxylon
Canavalia kauaiensis
Cassia artensis
Cassia fikifiki
Chadsia longidentata
Chamaecrista astrochiton
Chamaecrista brevifolia
Chamaecrista kolabensis
Chamaecrista myrophenges
Chapmannia reghidensis
Chapmannia tinireana
Cicer canariense
Cicer graecum
Clianthus puniceus, kaka-beak
Clitoria brachystegia
Coursetia planipetiolata
Crotalaria hemsleyi
Crotalaria mentiens
Crotalaria oxyphylloides
Crotalaria yaihsienensis
Cryptosepalum diphyllum
Cynometra bourdillonii
Cynometra cubensis
Cynometra lukei
Cynometra travancorica
Cynometra ulugurensis
Dalbergia abrahamii
Dalbergia andapensis
Dalbergia annamensis
Dalbergia bariensis
Dalbergia bathiei
Dalbergia bojeri
Dalbergia brachystachya
Dalbergia cambodiana
Dalbergia capuronii
Dalbergia congesta
Dalbergia davidii
Dalbergia delphinensis
Dalbergia erubescens
Dalbergia glaucocarpa
Dalbergia gloveri
Dalbergia hirticalyx
Dalbergia humbertii
Dalbergia louvelii
Dalbergia mammosa
Dalbergia maritima
Dalbergia normandii
Dalbergia oliveri
Dalbergia peishaensis
Dalbergia setifera
Dalbergia suaresensis
Dalbergia tsaratananensis
Dalbergia tsiandalana
Dalbergia urschii
Dalbergia xerophila
Dalea chrysophylla
Delonix pumila
Delonix velutina
Derris polyantha
Desmodium harmsii
Dialium excelsum
Dolichos reptans
Dorycnium spectabile
Ecuadendron acosta-solisianum
Elephantorrhiza rangei
Erythrina ankaranensis
Erythrina eggersii, cock's-spur
Erythrophleum fordii
Genista ancistrocarpa
Gigasiphon macrosiphon
Gleditsia rolfei
Gossweilerodendron balsamiferum
Humboldtia bourdillonii
Humboldtia vahliana
Hymenostegia gracilipes
Indigofera bemarahaensis
Indigofera itremoensis
Indigofera litoralis
Indigofera peltieri
Indigofera verruculosa
Inga arenicola
Inga bella
Inga blanchetiana
Inga bracteifera
Inga cabelo
Inga carinata
Inga exfoliata
Inga golfodulcensis
Inga herrerae
Inga jaunechensis
Inga jimenezii
Inga lacustris
Inga lanceifolia
Inga latipes
Inga litoralis
Inga maritima
Inga mendoncaei
Inga mortoniana
Inga multicaulis
Inga pedunculata
Inga platyptera
Inga sellowiana
Inga sinacae
Inga stenophylla
Inga suberosa
Inga tenuiloba
Jacksonia sericea
Kingiodendron pinnatum
Lamprolobium grandiflorum
Lemuropisum edule, lemur's pea
Leptoderris ledermannii
Leptoderris macrothyrsa
Lessertia argentea
Leucaena involucrata
Leucaena magnifica
Leucaena matudae
Lonchocarpus phlebophyllus
Lonchocarpus retiferus
Lotus callis-viridis
Lupinus nubigenus
Maackia taiwanensis
Machaerium nicaraguense
Macrolobium pittieri
Medicago saxatilis
Melolobium subspicatum
Millettia aurea
Millettia conraui
Millettia coruscans
Millettia hitsika
Millettia laurentii
Millettia micans
Millettia nathaliae
Millettia orientalis
Millettia taolanaroensis
Mimosa disperma
Mimosa longipes
Mimosa loxensis
Mimosa polydidyma
Mimosa ramentacea
Mimosa setistipula
Mimosa taimbensis
Mimosa townsendii
Mucuna manongarivensis
Mundulea anceps
Newtonia erlangeri
Ophrestia unicostata
Ormocarpopsis calcicola
Ormocarpopsis tulearensis
Ormocarpum klainei
Ormosia jamaicensis
Otholobium holosericeum
Pericopsis elata, African teak
Phaseolus rosei
Phylloxylon decipiens
Phylloxylon perrieri
Phylloxylon spinosa
Pithecellobium johansenii
Pithecellobium saxosum
Pithecellobium stevensonii
Platylobium alternifolium, Victorian flat-pea
Platymiscium pleiostachyum
Pongamiopsis amygdalina
Psoralea fascicularis
Pterocarpus santalinus, almug
Pterocarpus zenkeri
Pyranthus ambatoana
Pyranthus monantha
Sakoanala madagascariensis
Sclerolobium beaureipairei
Sclerolobium pilgerianum
Senna scandens
Sophora koreensis, Korean necklace-pod
Sophora mangarevaensis
Sophora raivavaeensis
Sophora saxicola
Sophora wightii
Stahlia monosperma
Swainsona recta, small purple-pea
Swartzia aureosericea
Swartzia littlei
Swartzia nuda
Swartzia robiniifolia
Talbotiella eketensis
Teline rosmarinifolia
Tephrosia angustissima, devil's shoestring
Tephrosia phylloxylon
Tephrosia retamoides
Tephrosia subaphylla
Tephrosia viguieri
Tessmannia densiflora
Vicia capreolata
Zapoteca aculeata
Zygia lehmannii
Zygia steyermarkii

Subspecies

Ceratonia oreothauma subsp. somalensis
Craibia brevicaudata subsp. burttii
Inga exalata subsp. umbilicata
Inga multijuga subsp. aestuariorum
Leobordea adpressa subsp. leptantha
Sakoanala villosa subsp. villosa

Varieties

Crotalaria laburnoides var. nudicarpa
Dalbergia cultrata var. cultrata
Humboldtia unijuga var. unijuga
Leucaena confertiflora var. adenotheloidea
Microcharis microcharoides var. latistipulata

Caryophyllales
There are 214 species and one subspecies in the order Caryophyllales assessed as endangered.

Caryophyllaceae

Cerastium sventenii
Dianthus charadzeae, Kharadze's pink
Dianthus diutinus
Dianthus grossheimii, Grossheim's pink
Drymaria stellarioides
Gypsophila papillosa
Gypsophila steupii, Steup's chalk plant
Moehringia fontqueri
Moehringia tommasinii
Polycarpaea garuensis
Polycarpaea rheophytica
Schiedea lychnoides
Schiedea spergulina
Silene diclinis
Silene fernandezii
Silene hifacensis
Silene holzmannii
Silene orphanidis
Silene sennenii

Amaranthaceae

Achyropsis filifolia
Alternanthera nesiotes
Charpentiera elliptica
Cyathula fernando-poensis
Irenella chrysotricha
Nototrichium humile
Psilotrichum aphyllum

Nyctaginaceae

Neea acuminatissima
Neea amplexicaulis
Neea ekmanii
Pisonia ekmani
Pisonia sechellarum
Pisonia wagneriana

Chenopodiaceae
Bassia saxicola

Portulacaceae

Portulaca samhaensis
Portulaca sclerocarpa
Portulaca sedifolia

Cactus
Species

Ariocarpus agavoides, Tamaulipas living rock cactus
Ariocarpus bravoanus
Ariocarpus scaphirostris
Arrojadoa eriocaulis
Arrojadoa multiflora
Arthrocereus glaziovii
Austrocactus spiniflorus
Brasilicereus phaeacanthus
Cephalocereus senilis, old man cactus
Cereus mirabella
Cipocereus crassisepalus
Cipocereus laniflorus
Cleistocactus jajoanus
Cleistocactus longiserpens
Cleistocactus sulcifer
Cleistocactus winteri
Coleocephalocereus buxbaumianus
Coleocephalocereus goebelianus
Coleocephalocereus pluricostatus
Coleocephalocereus uebelmanniorum
Consolea spinosissima
Copiapoa cinerascens
Copiapoa fiedleriana
Copiapoa grandiflora
Copiapoa hypogaea
Copiapoa serpentisulcata
Copiapoa solaris
Copiapoa taltalensis
Corryocactus ayacuchoensis
Corryocactus brachypetalus
Corryocactus pulquinensis
Corryocactus tarijensis
Corynopuntia bulbispina
Coryphantha maiz-tablasensis
Coryphantha pulleineana
Coryphantha pycnacantha
Dendrocereus nudiflorus
Discocactus diersianus
Discocactus ferricola
Discocactus pseudoinsignis
Disocactus biformis
Disocactus eichlamii
Disocactus macdougallii
Echinocactus grusonii, golden barrel
Echinocereus barthelowanus
Echinocereus chisosensis, Chisos Mountain hedgehog cactus
Echinocereus leucanthus
Echinocereus schmollii, lamb's tail cactus
Echinocereus sciurus
Echinopsis angelesiae
Echinopsis bolligeriana
Echinopsis caulescens
Echinopsis coquimbana
Echinopsis hertrichiana
Echinopsis oligotricha
Echinopsis pampana
Epiphyllum lepidocarpum
Eriosyce aspillagae
Eriosyce calderana
Eriosyce crispa
Eriosyce esmeraldana
Eriosyce iquiquensis
Eriosyce occulta
Eriosyce simulans
Eriosyce sociabilis
Eriosyce umadeave
Escobaria cubensis, Holguín dwarf cactus
Ferocactus chrysacanthus
Ferocactus flavovirens
Ferocactus haematacanthus
Frailea buenekeri
Frailea curvispina
Frailea fulviseta
Frailea mammifera
Gymnocalycium amerhauseri
Gymnocalycium denudatum
Gymnocalycium horstii
Gymnocalycium oenanthemum
Hatiora cylindrica
Hatiora herminiae
Hylocereus calcaratus
Kadenicarpus pseudomacrochele
Leptocereus arboreus
Leptocereus quadricostatus, sebucan
Maihueniopsis minuta
Mammillaria albicoma
Mammillaria aureilanata
Mammillaria capensis
Mammillaria coahuilensis
Mammillaria crucigera
Mammillaria eichlamii
Mammillaria gasseriana
Mammillaria hernandezii
Mammillaria johnstonii
Mammillaria mathildae
Mammillaria melaleuca
Mammillaria microhelia
Mammillaria parkinsonii
Mammillaria pectinifera
Mammillaria peninsularis
Mammillaria rettigiana
Mammillaria schumannii
Mammillaria supertexta
Mammillaria surculosa
Mammillaria zublerae
Matucana tuberculata
Matucana weberbaueri
Melocactus andinus
Melocactus azureus
Melocactus deinacanthus
Melocactus glaucescens
Melocactus lanssensianus
Melocactus matanzanus, dwarf Turk's cap cactus
Melocactus stramineus
Micranthocereus auriazureus
Micranthocereus hofackerianus
Micranthocereus polyanthus
Micranthocereus violaciflorus
Obregonia denegrii, artichoke cactus
Opuntia megarrhiza
Opuntia pachyrrhiza
Oroya peruviana
Pachycereus gaumeri
Parodia allosiphon
Parodia gaucha
Parodia hausteiniana
Parodia horstii
Parodia leninghausii
Parodia magnifica
Parodia mueller-melchersii
Parodia muricata
Parodia nigrispina
Parodia penicillata
Parodia rudibuenekeri
Parodia stockingeri
Parodia tenuicylindrica
Parodia warasii
Pediocactus paradinei, park pincushion-cactus
Peniocereus lazaro-cardenasii
Peniocereus macdougallii
Pereskia aureiflora
Pfeiffera micrantha
Pilosocereus magnificus
Pilosocereus multicostatus
Pilosocereus quadricentralis
Pilosocereus tillianus
Pilosocereus ulei
Pseudorhipsalis alata
Pygmaeocereus bieblii
Rebutia albipectinata
Rebutia glomeriseta
Rebutia krugerae
Rhipsalis crispata
Rhipsalis dissimilis
Rhipsalis pacheco-leonis
Schlumbergera kautskyi
Schlumbergera lutea syn. Hatiora epiphylloides
Schlumbergera orssichiana
Schlumbergera russelliana
Sclerocactus nyensis, Nye County fish-hook cactus
Selenicereus atropilosus
Siccobaccatus insigniflorus
Stenocereus chrysocarpus
Stenocereus humilis
Stenocereus martinezii
Tacinga estevesii
Tacinga subcylindrica
Tephrocactus bonnieae
Thelocactus hastifer
Turbinicarpus horripilus
Turbinicarpus subterraneus
Uebelmannia gummifera
Uebelmannia pectinifera
Weberbauerocereus cephalomacrostibas
Weberocereus imitans
Weberocereus trichophorus
Yavia cryptocarpa

Subspecies
Ariocarpus bravoanus subsp. hintonii

Aizoaceae
Delosperma gautengense

Fagales
Species

Betula megrelica, Megrelian birch
Betula talassica
Betula tianschanica
Corylus chinensis, Chinese hazelnut
Lithocarpus crassinervius
Lithocarpus kostermansii
Lithocarpus platycarpus
Nothofagus alessandrii, Fuscospora alessandri
Nothofagus womersleyi
Pasania dodonaeifolia
Quercus acerifolia, maple-leaved oak
Quercus basaseachicensis
Quercus brandegeei
Quercus carmenensis, Mexican oak
Quercus dumosa
Quercus georgiana, Georgia oak
Quercus havardii, shinnery oak
Quercus miquihuanensis
Quercus oglethorpensis, Oglethorpe oak
Quercus pacifica, island scrub oak

Varieties

Betula pendula var. fontqueri
Betula pendula var. parvibracteata
Quercus parvula var. parvula

Other dicotyledon species

Callitriche mathezii
Callitriche transvolgensis
Canacomyrica monticola
Carya sinensis, Chinese hickory
Cassipourea acuminata
Cassipourea brittoniana
Corylopsis coreana, Korean winter hazel
Distylium gracile
Hibbertia margaretae
Hibbertia tontoutensis
Hydrostachys angustisecta
Illicium griffithii
Juglans neotropica
Juglans olanchana
Lyonia elliptica
Lyonia maestrensis
Melanophylla modestei
Nastanthus falklandicus, false plantain
Oreomunnea pterocarpa
Paeonia parnassica
Papaver roseolum, pinkish poppy
Pellacalyx yunnanensis
Plantago algarbiensis
Plantago moorei, Moore's plantain
Populus guzmanantlensis
Salix kusanoi
Vaccinium whitmorei

Monocotyledons
There are 625 species, ten subspecies, and two varieties of monocotyledon assessed as endangered.

Arecales
Species

Aiphanes grandis
Aiphanes leiostachys
Aiphanes verrucosa
Areca concinna
Arenga micrantha
Astrocaryum triandrum
Bactris setiflora
Balaka microcarpa
Bentinckia nicobarica
Borassus madagascariensis
Brahea edulis
Ceroxylon alpinum
Ceroxylon amazonicum
Chamaedorea fractiflexa
Chamaedorea glaucifolia
Chamaedorea klotzschiana
Chuniophoenix hainanensis
Clinostigma samoense
Coccothrinax proctorii, silver palm
Copernicia ekmanii
Cryosophila bartlettii
Cyphosperma voutmelensis
Dypsis acaulis
Dypsis acuminum
Dypsis ambilaensis
Dypsis andapae
Dypsis angusta
Dypsis angustifolia
Dypsis boiviniana, talanoka
Dypsis bosseri
Dypsis ceracea
Dypsis corniculata
Dypsis culminis
Dypsis curtisii
Dypsis eriostachys
Dypsis faneva
Dypsis fanjana
Dypsis furcata
Dypsis glabrescens
Dypsis integra
Dypsis linearis
Dypsis lutea
Dypsis malcomberi
Dypsis mcdonaldiana
Dypsis mirabilis
Dypsis moorei
Dypsis poivreana
Dypsis psammophila
Dypsis rivularis
Dypsis saintelucei
Dypsis schatzii
Dypsis simianensis
Dypsis tenuissima
Dypsis turkii
Dypsis utilis
Gaussia spirituana
Geonoma irena
Heterospathe longipes
Hyophorbe indica, palmiste poison
Kentiopsis oliviformis
Latania loddigesii
Latania lontaroides
Latania verschaffeltii
Lemurophoenix halleuxii
Licuala borneensis
Livistona drudei
Lodoicea maldivica, double coconut palm
Marojejya darianii
Masoala kona
Neoveitchia storckii
Parajubaea sunkha, sunkha palm
Parajubaea torallyi
Phytelephas tumacana
Plectocomia dransfieldiana
Plectocomia microstachys
Ponapea hentyi
Pritchardia flynnii, Flynn's loulu
Pritchardia forbesiana
Pritchardia glabrata
Pritchardia lanaiensis
Pritchardia lanigera
Pritchardia minor, alakai swamp pritchardia
Pritchardia perlmanii
Pritchardia remota
Ravenea albicans
Ravenea dransfieldii
Ravenea hildebrandtii
Ravenea julietiae
Ravenea krociana
Ravenea nana
Ravenea rivularis, majestic palm
Roystonea dunlapiana
Roystonea stellata
Sabal bermudana, Bermuda palm
Satranala decussilvae
Syagrus macrocarpa
Trachycarpus nanus
Veitchia montgomeryana
Wettinia hirsuta
Wettinia minima

Subspecies
Coccothrinax crinita subsp. brevicrinis
Coccothrinax crinita subsp. crinita, old man

Orchidales
There are 245 species, four subspecies, and two varieties in Orchidales assessed as endangered.

Orchidaceae
Species

Acanthephippium sinense
Acianthera compressicaulis
Acianthera variegata
Aeranthes antennophora
Aeranthes neoperrieri
Aeranthes setipes
Aerides lawrenceae
Amesiella philippinensis
Amitostigma bifoliatum
Amitostigma capitatum
Amitostigma hemipilioides
Amitostigma simplex
Amitostigma tetralobum
Amitostigma yuanum
Anathallis tigridens, tiger toothed pleurothallis
Ancistrorhynchus refractus
Angraecopsis tenerrima
Angraecum amplexicaule
Angraecum cornucopiae
Angraecum coutrixii
Angraecum doratophyllum
Angraecum humbertii
Angraecum humblotianum
Angraecum moratii
Angraecum obesum
Angraecum protensum
Angraecum sambiranoense
Angraecum sanfordii
Angraecum setipes
Anoectochilus zhejiangensis
Benthamia elata
Benthamia humbertii
Benthamia nigrescens
Benthamia nivea
Benthamia praecox
Benthamia procera
Benthamia rostrata
Brachionidium dressleri, cup orchid
Brachionidium meridense
Brachycorythis disoides
Bulbophyllum anjozorobeense
Bulbophyllum auriflorum
Bulbophyllum concatenatum
Bulbophyllum horizontale
Bulbophyllum jumelleanum
Bulbophyllum kainochiloides
Bulbophyllum modicum
Bulbophyllum paleiferum
Bulbophyllum pandanetorum
Bulbophyllum rubrolabellum
Bulbophyllum tokioi
Bulleyia yunnanensis
Calanthe yuana
Cephalanthera cucullata
Changnienia amoena
Cheirostylis inabai
Cryptopus brachiatus
Cymbidium defoliatum
Cymbidium nanulum
Cynorkis aphylla
Cynorkis cuneilabia
Cynorkis gymnochiloides
Cynorkis perrieri
Cynorkis quinqueloba
Cynorkis sambiranoensis
Cynorkis stolonifera
Cynorkis zaratananae
Cypripedium calcicola, lime loving cypripedium
Cypripedium californicum, California lady's slipper
Cypripedium dickinsonianum, Dickinson's cypripedium
Cypripedium elegans, elegant cypripedium
Cypripedium fargesii
Cypripedium farreri, Farrer's cypripedium
Cypripedium fasciolatum, striped lady slipper
Cypripedium formosanum, Formosa's lady's slipper
Cypripedium forrestii, Forrest's cypripedium
Cypripedium franchetii, Franchet's cypripedium
Cypripedium himalaicum, Himalayan cypripedium
Cypripedium japonicum, Korean ladyslipper
Cypripedium lentiginosum, freckled cypripedium
Cypripedium lichiangense, Lijiang cypripedium
Cypripedium ludlowii, Ludlow's cypripedium
Cypripedium margaritaceum
Cypripedium micranthum, small flowered cypripedium
Cypripedium sichuanense, Sichuan cypripedium
Cypripedium singchii, Singchi's cypripedium
Cypripedium subtropicum, subtropical cypripedium
Cypripedium wardii, Ward's cypripedium
Cypripedium yunnanense, Yunnan cypripedium
Dactylorhiza kalopissii, Kalopiss' dactylorhiza
Dactylorhiza maurusia
Dendrobium changjiangense
Dendrobium flexicaule
Dendrobium guangxiense
Dendrobium leptocladum
Dendrobium lohohense
Dendrobium minutiflorum
Dendrobium sinense
Dendrobium wilsonii
Diaphananthe bueae
Diaphananthe tanneri
Disperis erucifera
Disperis kamerunensis
Disperis kerstenii
Disperis lanceolata
Disperis majungensis
Disperis masoalensis
Disperis nitida
Encyclia caicensis, wild shallot
Epipactis greuteri
Epipactis placentina
Epipactis tallosii
Eulophia coddii
Eulophia fernandeziana
Eulophia taiwanensis
Galeandra bicarinata, two-keeled hooded orchid
Gastrodia tuberculata
Gastrorchis tuberculosa
Genyorchis micropetala
Gomesa silvana, forest growing oncidium
Gymnadenia archiducis-joannis
Gymnadenia bicornis
Gymnadenia crassinervis
Gymnadenia lithopolitanica
Gymnadenia stiriaca
Gymnadenia widderi
Habenaria batesii
Habenaria isoantha
Habenaria leucoceras
Habenaria mossii
Habenaria richardsiae
Hederorkis seychellensis
Hemipilia amesiana
Hemipilia crassicalcarata
Hemipilia cruciata
Hemipilia henryi
Hexalectris warnockii, Texas crested coralroot
Himantoglossum metlesicsianum, Metlesics' himantoglossum
Holcoglossum quasipinifolium
Holopogon smithianus
Jumellea anjouanensis
Liparis bautingensis
Manniella cypripedioides
Masdevallia atahualpa
Myrmecophila thomsoniana, banana orchid
Mystacidium pulchellum
Neottianthe camptoceras
Orchis sitiaca, Cretan orchid
Panisea yunnanensis
Paphiopedilum acmodontum, pointed tooth paphiopedilum
Paphiopedilum appletonianum, Appleton's paphiopedilum
Paphiopedilum areeanum
Paphiopedilum argus, Argus paphiopedilum
Paphiopedilum armeniacum, apricot orange paphiopedilum
Paphiopedilum barbatum, bearded paphiopedilum
Paphiopedilum barbigerum, beard carrying paphiopedilum
Paphiopedilum bellatulum, enchanting paphiopedilum
Paphiopedilum bullenianum, Bullen's paphiopedilum
Paphiopedilum callosum, callus paphiopedilum
Paphiopedilum charlesworthii, Charlesworth paphiopedilum
Paphiopedilum ciliolare, short haired paphiopedilum
Paphiopedilum concolor, one colored paphiopedilum
Paphiopedilum dianthum, double flowered paphiopedilum
Paphiopedilum glanduliferum, gland-bearing paphiopedilum
Paphiopedilum glaucophyllum, shiney green leaf paphiopedilum
Paphiopedilum godefroyae, Godefroy's paphiopedilum
Paphiopedilum haynaldianum, Haynald's paphiopedilum
Paphiopedilum hennisianum, Hennis' paphiopedilum
Paphiopedilum hookerae, Hooker's paphiopedilum
Paphiopedilum insigne, splendid paphiopedilum
Paphiopedilum javanicum, Java paphiopedilum
Paphiopedilum lowii, Low's paphiopedilum
Paphiopedilum malipoense, Malipo paphiopedilum
Paphiopedilum mastersianum
Paphiopedilum niveum, snow-white paphiopedilum
Paphiopedilum papuanum, Papua paphiopedilum
Paphiopedilum parishii, Parish's paphiopedilum
Paphiopedilum randsii, Rands' paphiopedilum
Paphiopedilum spicerianum, Spicer's paphiopedilum
Paphiopedilum superbiens, outstanding paphiopedilum
Paphiopedilum tigrinum, tiger striped paphiopedilum
Paphiopedilum tonsum, bald paphiopedilum
Paphiopedilum venustum, charming paphiopedilum
Paphiopedilum violascens, shimmering purple paphiopedilum
Paphiopedilum wardii, Ward's paphiopedilum
Paphiopedilum wilhelminae, Wilhelminha's paphiopedium
Phalaenopsis lindenii
Phragmipedium besseae, Besse's phragmipedium
Phragmipedium caudatum, tailed phragmipedium
Phragmipedium hartwegii, Hartweg's phragmipedium
Phragmipedium hirtzii, Hirtz' phragmipedium
Phragmipedium klotzschianum, Klotsch's phragmipedium
Phragmipedium sargentianum, Sargent's phragmipedium
Phragmipedium schlimii, Schlimm's phragmipedium
Physoceras boryanum
Pityphyllum pinoides
Platanthera micrantha
Platanthera praeclara, western prairie fringed orchid
Platanthera yosemitensis, Yosemite bog orchid
Pleione forrestii
Polystachya caudata
Polystachya cooperi
Polystachya disiformis
Polystachya farinosa syn. Polystachya bifida
Polystachya fischeri
Polystachya geniculata
Polystachya holstii
Polystachya isochiloides
Polystachya longiscapa
Polystachya mazumbaiensis
Polystachya praecipitis
Polystachya pudorina
Polystachya serpentina
Polystachya shega
Polystachya subdiphylla
Polystachya superposita
Polystachya teitensis
Polystachya uluguruensis
Polystachya xerophila
Selenipedium aequinoctiale, equatorial occurring selenipedium
Selenipedium chica, beautiful selenipedium
Selenipedium dodsonii
Selenipedium isabelianum, Isabel's selenipedium
Selenipedium steyermarkii, Steyermark's selenipedium
Smithorchis calceoliformis syn. Platanthera calceoliformis
Spiranthes brevilabris, Texas ladies'-tresses
Spiranthes delitescens, Canelo Hills ladies'-tresses
Stolzia angustifolia
Stolzia atrorubra
Stolzia christopheri
Stolzia leedalii
Stolzia moniliformis
Stolzia oligantha
Stolzia viridis
Trichoglottis tenuis
Tridactyle brevifolia
Tridactyle cruciformis
Tridactyle minuta
Tridactyle tanneri
Triphora craigheadii, Craighead's noddingcaps
Triphora yucatanensis
Vanda javierae
Vanda scandens
Vanilla somai

Subspecies

Disperis aphylla subsp. bifolia
Habenaria stylites subsp. stylites
Polystachya albescens subsp. angustifolia
Polystachya caespitifica subsp. caespitifica

Varieties
Myrmecophila thomsoniana var. minor
Myrmecophila thomsoniana var. thomsoniana

Burmanniaceae
Gymnosiphon usambaricus

Cyclanthales

Asplundia domingensis
Asplundia nonoensis
Asplundia truncata
Dicranopygium campii
Dicranopygium coma-pyrrhae

Bromeliales

Aechmea kentii
Aechmea kleinii
Aechmea manzanaresiana
Aechmea tayoensis
Bromelia nidus-puellae
Dyckia reitzii
Encholirium luxor
Gregbrownia fulgens syn. Mezobromelia fulgens
Guzmania albescens
Guzmania alcantareoides
Guzmania condorensis
Guzmania ecuadorensis
Guzmania fuerstenbergiana
Guzmania fuquae
Guzmania henniae
Guzmania osyana
Guzmania roseiflora
Guzmania rubrolutea
Hohenbergiopsis guatemalensis
Neoregelia azevedoi
Pitcairnia aequatorialis
Pitcairnia alata
Pitcairnia alexanderi syn. Pepinia alexanderi
Pitcairnia bergii
Pitcairnia caduciflora
Pitcairnia clarkii
Pitcairnia hooveri syn. Pepinia hooveri
Pitcairnia lutescens
Pitcairnia oblongifolia
Pitcairnia poeppigiana
Pitcairnia reflexiflora
Puya angelensis
Puya castellanosii
Puya parviflora
Puya raimondii, queen of the Andes
Puya roseana
Racinaea inconspicua
Racinaea tripinnata
Rokautskyia pseudoscaposa syn. Cryptanthus pseudoscaposus
Ronnbergia campanulata
Tillandsia acosta-solisii
Tillandsia cernua
Tillandsia demissa
Tillandsia homostachya
Tillandsia indigofera
Tillandsia nervisepala
Tillandsia pachyaxon
Tillandsia polyantha
Tillandsia portillae
Tillandsia pseudomontana
Tillandsia rubroviolacea
Tillandsia umbellata
Tillandsia zarumensis
Vriesea appendiculata
Vriesea drewii
Vriesea petraea
Vriesea strobeliae
Werauhia diantha

Liliales
There are 96 species and two subspecies in the order Liliales assessed as endangered.

Dracaenaceae

Chrysodracon fernaldii
Chrysodracon forbesii, Forbes' dracaena
Chrysodracon hawaiiensis
Dracaena concinna
Dracaena floribunda
Dracaena ombet, Gabal Elba dragon tree
Dracaena serrulata

Iridaceae

Crocus aerius, aerial crocus
Iris bismarckiana, Nazareth iris
Iris bostrensis
Iris grant-duffii, Grant Duff's iris
Iris hermona, Golan iris
Iris koreana
Iris lortetii
Iris odaesanensis
Iris sofarana, sofar iris
Iris timofejewii, Timofeev's iris
Iris westii
Romulea aquatica

Aloaceae
Species

Aloe adigratana
Aloe albovestita
Aloe ambigens
Aloe ankoberensis
Aloe ballii
Aloe ballyi, rat aloe
Aloe bella
Aloe brandhamii
Aloe cremnophila
Aloe erensii
Aloe erinacea
Aloe friisii
Aloe gillettii
Aloe gracilicaulis
Aloe grisea
Aloe harlana
Aloe hildebrandtii
Aloe kefaensis
Aloe ketabrowniorum
Aloe kilifiensis
Aloe monticola
Aloe peckii
Aloe peglerae
Aloe penduliflora
Aloe schelpei
Aloe scobinifolia
Aloe sinana
Aloe sinkatana
Aloe yavellana

Aloidendron eminens
Subspecies
Aloe megalacantha subsp. alticola

Amaryllidaceae
Species

Acis nicaeensis
Caliphruria hartwegiana
Crinum thaianum, onion plant
Eucharis astrophiala
Eucrosia aurantiaca
Narcissus alcaracensis
Narcissus bugei
Narcissus longispathus
Narcissus nevadensis
Narcissus radinganorum
Phaedranassa brevifolia
Phaedranassa glauciflora
Phaedranassa tunguraguae
Phaedranassa viridiflora
Strumaria chaplinii

Subspecies
Narcissus nevadensis subsp. nevadensis, daffodil

Liliaceae

Fritillaria conica
Fritillaria epirotica
Fritillaria falcata, talus fritillary
Fritillaria kaiensis
Fritillaria obliqua
Fritillaria rhodocanakis
Gagea dayana
Gagea elliptica
Lilium ciliatum, ciliate lily
Tulipa cypria

Other Liliales species

Agave caymanensis
Allium pervestitum
Allium pseudoalbidum, onion
Allium struzlianum, Struzl's onion
Androcymbium rechingeri
Asparagus fallax
Asparagus nesiotes
Asparagus usambarensis
Astelia argyrocoma
Bellevalia webbiana
Bomarea ceratophora
Bomarea chimborazensis
Bomarea uncifolia
Chlorophytum sp.
Colchicum mirzoevae, Mirzoeva's merendera
Dioscorea chimborazensis
Dioscorea choriandra
Hypoxidia maheensis
Iphigenia stellata
Kniphofia reflexa
Ledebouria insularis
Leopoldia gussonei

Arales

Araceae
Species

Amorphophallus stuhlmannii
Anthurium barbacoasense
Anthurium bucayanum
Anthurium bushii
Anthurium cutucuense
Anthurium hieronymi
Anthurium lennartii
Anthurium pichinchae
Anthurium saccardoi
Anthurium scaberulum
Anthurium splendidum
Anthurium tenuifolium
Arisaema heterocephalum
Chlorospatha besseae
Chlorospatha cutucuensis
Cryptocoryne cognata
Dracontium croatii
Gonatopus marattioides
Gorgonidium intermedium
Philodendron quitense
Philodendron ventricosum
Stenospermation arborescens
Stylochaeton bogneri
Stylochaeton pilosus
Typhonium circinnatum
Xanthosoma eggersii

Subspecies
Arisaema heterocephalum subsp. heterocephalum

Zingiberales

Amomum celsum
Amomum stephanocoleum
Calathea anulque
Calathea chimboracensis
Calathea hagbergii
Calathea ischnosiphonoides
Calathea libbyana
Calathea roseobracteata
Costus nitidus
Costus zamoranus
Curcuma caulina
Curcuma coriacea
Globba colpicola
Globba laeta
Marantochloa mildbraedii
Monotagma rudanii
Newmania orthostachys
Sarcophrynium villosum
Siliquamomum oreodoxa
Zingiber monophyllum

Eriocaulales

Eriocaulon anshiense
Eriocaulon australasicum, austral pipewort
Eriocaulon dalzellii
Eriocaulon richardianum
Eriocaulon selousii
Eriocaulon stipantepalum

Commelinales

Commelina zigzag
Cyanotis cupricola
Floscopa mannii
Xyris calostachys
Xyris pancheri

Cyperales
There are 55 species in Cyperales assessed as endangered.

Gramineae

Agropyron cimmericum, Kerch wheatgrass
Agropyron dasyanthum, edge flowered crested wheatgrass
Agrostis trachychlaena
Ancistrachne numaeensis
Andropogon lanuginosus
Andropogon scabriglumis
Bothriochloa campii
Calamagrostis brevipaleata
Calamagrostis hillebrandii
Calamagrostis parsana
Dimeria hohenackeri
Dinochloa prunifera
Eragrostis pseudopoa
Eragrostis saxatilis
Festuca densipaniculata
Festuca pontica, Pontic fescue
Festuca xenophontis, fescue
Hickelia africana
Isachne swaminathanii
Ischaemum vembanadense
Leptochloa ginae
Limnopoa meeboldii
Micropyropsis tuberosa
Muhlenbergia palmirensis
Neurolepis elata
Oryza neocaledonica
Panicum acostia
Panicum nudiflorum
Paspalum azuayense
Paspalum soboliferum
Pentameris ecklonii
Pharus ecuadoricus
Poa riphaea
Pseudarrhenatherum pallens
Stipa styriaca
Stipa veneta
Uniola condensata

Cyperaceae

Bulbostylis bodardii
Bulbostylis guineensis
Carex azuayae
Carex bermudiana, Bermuda sedge
Carex fissirostris
Carex kauaiensis
Carex toreadora
Cyperus afrodunensis
Cyperus felicis
Cyperus pennatiformis
Fimbristylis crystallina
Fimbristylis dauciformis
Hypolytrum cacuminum
Hypolytrum pseudomapanioides
Kyllinga pluristaminea
Rhynchospora modesti-lucennoi
Scleria afroreflexa
Uncinia lacustris

Najadales

Aponogeton bogneri
Aponogeton ranunculiflorus
Aponogeton satarensis
Phyllospadix japonicus, Asian surf grass
Pseudalthenia aschersoniana
Zostera chilensis
Zostera geojeensis

Other monocotyledons
Species
Pandanus lacuum
Sagittaria lichuanensis
Subspecies
Juncus bufonius subsp. mogadorensis

See also 
 Lists of IUCN Red List endangered species
 List of least concern plants
 List of near threatened plants
 List of vulnerable plants
 List of critically endangered plants
 List of recently extinct plants
 List of data deficient plants

Notes

References 

Plants
Endangered plants